

573001–573100 

|-bgcolor=#E9E9E9
| 573001 ||  || — || November 2, 2008 || Mount Lemmon || Mount Lemmon Survey ||  || align=right | 1.7 km || 
|-id=002 bgcolor=#E9E9E9
| 573002 ||  || — || October 6, 2008 || Mount Lemmon || Mount Lemmon Survey ||  || align=right | 2.6 km || 
|-id=003 bgcolor=#E9E9E9
| 573003 ||  || — || March 4, 2005 || Mount Lemmon || Mount Lemmon Survey ||  || align=right | 1.7 km || 
|-id=004 bgcolor=#fefefe
| 573004 ||  || — || November 3, 2008 || Mount Lemmon || Mount Lemmon Survey || H || align=right data-sort-value="0.45" | 450 m || 
|-id=005 bgcolor=#E9E9E9
| 573005 ||  || — || January 16, 2005 || Kitt Peak || Spacewatch ||  || align=right | 2.0 km || 
|-id=006 bgcolor=#E9E9E9
| 573006 ||  || — || November 3, 2008 || Mount Lemmon || Mount Lemmon Survey ||  || align=right | 1.7 km || 
|-id=007 bgcolor=#E9E9E9
| 573007 ||  || — || March 3, 2006 || Kitt Peak || Spacewatch ||  || align=right | 2.1 km || 
|-id=008 bgcolor=#E9E9E9
| 573008 ||  || — || November 12, 1999 || Kitt Peak || Spacewatch ||  || align=right | 1.6 km || 
|-id=009 bgcolor=#E9E9E9
| 573009 ||  || — || October 27, 2008 || Kitt Peak || Spacewatch ||  || align=right | 1.8 km || 
|-id=010 bgcolor=#E9E9E9
| 573010 ||  || — || November 8, 2008 || Mount Lemmon || Mount Lemmon Survey ||  || align=right | 1.9 km || 
|-id=011 bgcolor=#E9E9E9
| 573011 ||  || — || November 7, 2008 || Mount Lemmon || Mount Lemmon Survey ||  || align=right | 1.0 km || 
|-id=012 bgcolor=#E9E9E9
| 573012 ||  || — || November 9, 2008 || Kitt Peak || Spacewatch ||  || align=right | 1.9 km || 
|-id=013 bgcolor=#E9E9E9
| 573013 ||  || — || November 9, 2008 || Mount Lemmon || Mount Lemmon Survey ||  || align=right | 2.4 km || 
|-id=014 bgcolor=#E9E9E9
| 573014 ||  || — || November 1, 2008 || Mount Lemmon || Mount Lemmon Survey ||  || align=right | 2.3 km || 
|-id=015 bgcolor=#E9E9E9
| 573015 ||  || — || November 3, 2008 || Mount Lemmon || Mount Lemmon Survey ||  || align=right | 2.2 km || 
|-id=016 bgcolor=#d6d6d6
| 573016 ||  || — || November 9, 2008 || Mount Lemmon || Mount Lemmon Survey ||  || align=right | 2.3 km || 
|-id=017 bgcolor=#E9E9E9
| 573017 ||  || — || August 8, 2012 || Haleakala || Pan-STARRS ||  || align=right | 1.6 km || 
|-id=018 bgcolor=#E9E9E9
| 573018 ||  || — || October 4, 2008 || Mount Lemmon || Mount Lemmon Survey ||  || align=right | 2.1 km || 
|-id=019 bgcolor=#E9E9E9
| 573019 ||  || — || November 28, 2013 || Mount Lemmon || Mount Lemmon Survey ||  || align=right | 1.5 km || 
|-id=020 bgcolor=#E9E9E9
| 573020 ||  || — || June 11, 2015 || Haleakala || Pan-STARRS ||  || align=right data-sort-value="0.94" | 940 m || 
|-id=021 bgcolor=#fefefe
| 573021 ||  || — || August 2, 2011 || Haleakala || Pan-STARRS ||  || align=right data-sort-value="0.70" | 700 m || 
|-id=022 bgcolor=#E9E9E9
| 573022 ||  || — || November 7, 2008 || Mount Lemmon || Mount Lemmon Survey ||  || align=right | 2.2 km || 
|-id=023 bgcolor=#E9E9E9
| 573023 ||  || — || November 9, 2008 || Mount Lemmon || Mount Lemmon Survey ||  || align=right | 2.2 km || 
|-id=024 bgcolor=#E9E9E9
| 573024 ||  || — || January 23, 2015 || Haleakala || Pan-STARRS ||  || align=right | 2.0 km || 
|-id=025 bgcolor=#E9E9E9
| 573025 ||  || — || August 14, 2012 || Haleakala || Pan-STARRS ||  || align=right | 1.7 km || 
|-id=026 bgcolor=#E9E9E9
| 573026 ||  || — || November 2, 2008 || Mount Lemmon || Mount Lemmon Survey ||  || align=right | 1.4 km || 
|-id=027 bgcolor=#fefefe
| 573027 ||  || — || November 9, 2008 || Kitt Peak || Spacewatch ||  || align=right data-sort-value="0.53" | 530 m || 
|-id=028 bgcolor=#fefefe
| 573028 ||  || — || September 26, 2013 || Mount Lemmon || Mount Lemmon Survey || H || align=right data-sort-value="0.54" | 540 m || 
|-id=029 bgcolor=#d6d6d6
| 573029 ||  || — || September 9, 2013 || Haleakala || Pan-STARRS ||  || align=right | 3.4 km || 
|-id=030 bgcolor=#E9E9E9
| 573030 ||  || — || December 11, 2013 || Haleakala || Pan-STARRS ||  || align=right | 1.9 km || 
|-id=031 bgcolor=#d6d6d6
| 573031 ||  || — || November 28, 2013 || Haleakala || Pan-STARRS ||  || align=right | 3.1 km || 
|-id=032 bgcolor=#E9E9E9
| 573032 ||  || — || November 9, 2008 || Kitt Peak || Spacewatch ||  || align=right | 1.8 km || 
|-id=033 bgcolor=#E9E9E9
| 573033 ||  || — || November 1, 2008 || Mount Lemmon || Mount Lemmon Survey ||  || align=right | 1.9 km || 
|-id=034 bgcolor=#E9E9E9
| 573034 ||  || — || November 8, 2008 || Kitt Peak || Spacewatch ||  || align=right | 1.9 km || 
|-id=035 bgcolor=#E9E9E9
| 573035 ||  || — || October 1, 2008 || Kitt Peak || Spacewatch ||  || align=right | 1.6 km || 
|-id=036 bgcolor=#E9E9E9
| 573036 ||  || — || November 7, 2008 || Mount Lemmon || Mount Lemmon Survey ||  || align=right | 1.2 km || 
|-id=037 bgcolor=#E9E9E9
| 573037 ||  || — || November 7, 2008 || Mount Lemmon || Mount Lemmon Survey ||  || align=right | 2.0 km || 
|-id=038 bgcolor=#E9E9E9
| 573038 ||  || — || September 18, 2003 || Kitt Peak || Spacewatch ||  || align=right | 1.5 km || 
|-id=039 bgcolor=#fefefe
| 573039 ||  || — || November 2, 2008 || Mount Lemmon || Mount Lemmon Survey ||  || align=right data-sort-value="0.52" | 520 m || 
|-id=040 bgcolor=#E9E9E9
| 573040 ||  || — || November 6, 2008 || Mount Lemmon || Mount Lemmon Survey ||  || align=right | 1.9 km || 
|-id=041 bgcolor=#E9E9E9
| 573041 ||  || — || November 3, 2008 || Mount Lemmon || Mount Lemmon Survey ||  || align=right | 1.1 km || 
|-id=042 bgcolor=#d6d6d6
| 573042 ||  || — || November 7, 2008 || Mount Lemmon || Mount Lemmon Survey ||  || align=right | 2.1 km || 
|-id=043 bgcolor=#E9E9E9
| 573043 ||  || — || November 2, 2008 || Kitt Peak || Spacewatch ||  || align=right | 1.6 km || 
|-id=044 bgcolor=#E9E9E9
| 573044 ||  || — || September 22, 2008 || Catalina || CSS ||  || align=right | 1.7 km || 
|-id=045 bgcolor=#FA8072
| 573045 ||  || — || November 18, 2008 || Socorro || LINEAR || H || align=right data-sort-value="0.76" | 760 m || 
|-id=046 bgcolor=#E9E9E9
| 573046 ||  || — || September 28, 2008 || Mount Lemmon || Mount Lemmon Survey ||  || align=right | 1.7 km || 
|-id=047 bgcolor=#E9E9E9
| 573047 ||  || — || October 28, 2008 || Kitt Peak || Spacewatch ||  || align=right data-sort-value="0.68" | 680 m || 
|-id=048 bgcolor=#fefefe
| 573048 ||  || — || September 9, 2008 || Mount Lemmon || Mount Lemmon Survey ||  || align=right data-sort-value="0.65" | 650 m || 
|-id=049 bgcolor=#E9E9E9
| 573049 ||  || — || September 18, 2003 || Kitt Peak || Spacewatch ||  || align=right | 2.4 km || 
|-id=050 bgcolor=#E9E9E9
| 573050 ||  || — || October 9, 2008 || Kitt Peak || Spacewatch ||  || align=right | 1.8 km || 
|-id=051 bgcolor=#E9E9E9
| 573051 ||  || — || September 28, 2003 || Kitt Peak || Spacewatch ||  || align=right | 2.0 km || 
|-id=052 bgcolor=#E9E9E9
| 573052 ||  || — || November 17, 2008 || Kitt Peak || Spacewatch ||  || align=right | 1.7 km || 
|-id=053 bgcolor=#E9E9E9
| 573053 ||  || — || October 27, 2008 || Mount Lemmon || Mount Lemmon Survey ||  || align=right | 1.9 km || 
|-id=054 bgcolor=#d6d6d6
| 573054 ||  || — || October 20, 2003 || Kitt Peak || Spacewatch ||  || align=right | 2.3 km || 
|-id=055 bgcolor=#E9E9E9
| 573055 ||  || — || November 17, 2008 || Kitt Peak || Spacewatch ||  || align=right | 1.9 km || 
|-id=056 bgcolor=#fefefe
| 573056 ||  || — || November 17, 2008 || Kitt Peak || Spacewatch ||  || align=right data-sort-value="0.50" | 500 m || 
|-id=057 bgcolor=#E9E9E9
| 573057 ||  || — || October 22, 2003 || Kitt Peak || Spacewatch ||  || align=right | 2.7 km || 
|-id=058 bgcolor=#E9E9E9
| 573058 ||  || — || November 17, 2008 || Kitt Peak || Spacewatch ||  || align=right | 1.8 km || 
|-id=059 bgcolor=#d6d6d6
| 573059 ||  || — || May 24, 2006 || Kitt Peak || Spacewatch ||  || align=right | 1.8 km || 
|-id=060 bgcolor=#E9E9E9
| 573060 ||  || — || October 27, 2008 || Kitt Peak || Spacewatch ||  || align=right | 1.6 km || 
|-id=061 bgcolor=#d6d6d6
| 573061 ||  || — || November 19, 2008 || Kitt Peak || Spacewatch ||  || align=right | 1.8 km || 
|-id=062 bgcolor=#fefefe
| 573062 ||  || — || October 23, 2008 || Kitt Peak || Spacewatch ||  || align=right data-sort-value="0.77" | 770 m || 
|-id=063 bgcolor=#E9E9E9
| 573063 ||  || — || May 6, 2006 || Mount Lemmon || Mount Lemmon Survey ||  || align=right | 2.0 km || 
|-id=064 bgcolor=#fefefe
| 573064 ||  || — || December 7, 2001 || Kitt Peak || Spacewatch ||  || align=right data-sort-value="0.61" | 610 m || 
|-id=065 bgcolor=#E9E9E9
| 573065 ||  || — || October 28, 2008 || Kitt Peak || Spacewatch ||  || align=right | 1.6 km || 
|-id=066 bgcolor=#E9E9E9
| 573066 ||  || — || November 19, 2008 || Mount Lemmon || Mount Lemmon Survey ||  || align=right | 1.5 km || 
|-id=067 bgcolor=#E9E9E9
| 573067 ||  || — || September 29, 2003 || Kitt Peak || Spacewatch ||  || align=right | 2.1 km || 
|-id=068 bgcolor=#d6d6d6
| 573068 ||  || — || November 20, 2008 || Kitt Peak || Spacewatch ||  || align=right | 1.6 km || 
|-id=069 bgcolor=#E9E9E9
| 573069 ||  || — || November 7, 2008 || Mount Lemmon || Mount Lemmon Survey ||  || align=right | 2.1 km || 
|-id=070 bgcolor=#fefefe
| 573070 ||  || — || November 7, 2008 || Mount Lemmon || Mount Lemmon Survey ||  || align=right data-sort-value="0.61" | 610 m || 
|-id=071 bgcolor=#fefefe
| 573071 ||  || — || November 20, 2008 || Kitt Peak || Spacewatch ||  || align=right data-sort-value="0.76" | 760 m || 
|-id=072 bgcolor=#E9E9E9
| 573072 ||  || — || October 23, 2008 || Kitt Peak || Spacewatch ||  || align=right | 2.2 km || 
|-id=073 bgcolor=#E9E9E9
| 573073 ||  || — || September 19, 2003 || Kitt Peak || Spacewatch ||  || align=right | 1.8 km || 
|-id=074 bgcolor=#d6d6d6
| 573074 ||  || — || November 21, 2008 || Mount Lemmon || Mount Lemmon Survey ||  || align=right | 2.5 km || 
|-id=075 bgcolor=#E9E9E9
| 573075 ||  || — || November 21, 2008 || Cerro Burek || Alianza S4 Obs. ||  || align=right | 2.5 km || 
|-id=076 bgcolor=#E9E9E9
| 573076 ||  || — || September 19, 2003 || Kitt Peak || Spacewatch ||  || align=right | 1.6 km || 
|-id=077 bgcolor=#E9E9E9
| 573077 ||  || — || October 25, 2008 || Catalina || CSS ||  || align=right | 1.7 km || 
|-id=078 bgcolor=#FA8072
| 573078 ||  || — || November 20, 2008 || Kitt Peak || Spacewatch ||  || align=right data-sort-value="0.35" | 350 m || 
|-id=079 bgcolor=#E9E9E9
| 573079 ||  || — || November 30, 2008 || Catalina || CSS ||  || align=right | 1.7 km || 
|-id=080 bgcolor=#fefefe
| 573080 ||  || — || November 18, 2008 || Kitt Peak || Spacewatch ||  || align=right data-sort-value="0.71" | 710 m || 
|-id=081 bgcolor=#d6d6d6
| 573081 ||  || — || November 17, 2008 || Kitt Peak || Spacewatch ||  || align=right | 2.4 km || 
|-id=082 bgcolor=#E9E9E9
| 573082 ||  || — || September 5, 2008 || Kitt Peak || Spacewatch ||  || align=right | 2.6 km || 
|-id=083 bgcolor=#d6d6d6
| 573083 ||  || — || November 30, 2008 || Mount Lemmon || Mount Lemmon Survey ||  || align=right | 1.9 km || 
|-id=084 bgcolor=#fefefe
| 573084 ||  || — || November 24, 2008 || Mount Lemmon || Mount Lemmon Survey ||  || align=right data-sort-value="0.91" | 910 m || 
|-id=085 bgcolor=#d6d6d6
| 573085 ||  || — || November 18, 2008 || Kitt Peak || Spacewatch ||  || align=right | 2.0 km || 
|-id=086 bgcolor=#fefefe
| 573086 ||  || — || September 24, 2011 || Catalina || CSS ||  || align=right data-sort-value="0.81" | 810 m || 
|-id=087 bgcolor=#d6d6d6
| 573087 ||  || — || November 30, 2008 || Mount Lemmon || Mount Lemmon Survey ||  || align=right | 1.9 km || 
|-id=088 bgcolor=#E9E9E9
| 573088 ||  || — || November 24, 2008 || Mount Lemmon || Mount Lemmon Survey ||  || align=right | 2.0 km || 
|-id=089 bgcolor=#fefefe
| 573089 ||  || — || November 20, 2008 || Mount Lemmon || Mount Lemmon Survey ||  || align=right data-sort-value="0.55" | 550 m || 
|-id=090 bgcolor=#E9E9E9
| 573090 ||  || — || November 19, 2008 || Kitt Peak || Spacewatch ||  || align=right | 1.1 km || 
|-id=091 bgcolor=#fefefe
| 573091 ||  || — || September 19, 2011 || Haleakala || Pan-STARRS ||  || align=right data-sort-value="0.63" | 630 m || 
|-id=092 bgcolor=#fefefe
| 573092 ||  || — || November 21, 2008 || Kitt Peak || Spacewatch ||  || align=right | 1.1 km || 
|-id=093 bgcolor=#fefefe
| 573093 ||  || — || November 19, 2008 || Mount Lemmon || Mount Lemmon Survey ||  || align=right data-sort-value="0.80" | 800 m || 
|-id=094 bgcolor=#E9E9E9
| 573094 ||  || — || June 29, 2011 || Kitt Peak || Spacewatch ||  || align=right | 2.4 km || 
|-id=095 bgcolor=#E9E9E9
| 573095 ||  || — || August 14, 2012 || Haleakala || Pan-STARRS ||  || align=right | 1.8 km || 
|-id=096 bgcolor=#d6d6d6
| 573096 ||  || — || October 31, 2013 || Kitt Peak || Spacewatch ||  || align=right | 2.4 km || 
|-id=097 bgcolor=#E9E9E9
| 573097 ||  || — || November 19, 2008 || Kitt Peak || Spacewatch ||  || align=right | 1.9 km || 
|-id=098 bgcolor=#E9E9E9
| 573098 ||  || — || July 4, 2016 || Kitt Peak || Spacewatch ||  || align=right | 1.7 km || 
|-id=099 bgcolor=#E9E9E9
| 573099 ||  || — || March 21, 2015 || Haleakala || Pan-STARRS ||  || align=right | 1.6 km || 
|-id=100 bgcolor=#fefefe
| 573100 ||  || — || November 19, 2008 || Kitt Peak || Spacewatch ||  || align=right data-sort-value="0.57" | 570 m || 
|}

573101–573200 

|-bgcolor=#E9E9E9
| 573101 ||  || — || November 19, 2008 || Kitt Peak || Spacewatch ||  || align=right | 1.8 km || 
|-id=102 bgcolor=#fefefe
| 573102 ||  || — || November 30, 2008 || Mount Lemmon || Mount Lemmon Survey ||  || align=right data-sort-value="0.69" | 690 m || 
|-id=103 bgcolor=#fefefe
| 573103 ||  || — || December 1, 2008 || Mount Lemmon || Mount Lemmon Survey ||  || align=right data-sort-value="0.59" | 590 m || 
|-id=104 bgcolor=#E9E9E9
| 573104 ||  || — || December 1, 2008 || Mount Lemmon || Mount Lemmon Survey ||  || align=right | 1.8 km || 
|-id=105 bgcolor=#d6d6d6
| 573105 ||  || — || November 19, 2008 || Kitt Peak || Spacewatch ||  || align=right | 2.7 km || 
|-id=106 bgcolor=#E9E9E9
| 573106 ||  || — || November 3, 2008 || Mount Lemmon || Mount Lemmon Survey ||  || align=right | 2.6 km || 
|-id=107 bgcolor=#E9E9E9
| 573107 ||  || — || November 18, 2008 || Kitt Peak || Spacewatch ||  || align=right | 2.0 km || 
|-id=108 bgcolor=#E9E9E9
| 573108 ||  || — || December 9, 2004 || Catalina || CSS ||  || align=right | 2.0 km || 
|-id=109 bgcolor=#fefefe
| 573109 ||  || — || January 23, 2006 || Kitt Peak || Spacewatch ||  || align=right data-sort-value="0.72" | 720 m || 
|-id=110 bgcolor=#d6d6d6
| 573110 ||  || — || December 1, 2008 || Kitt Peak || Spacewatch ||  || align=right | 3.5 km || 
|-id=111 bgcolor=#E9E9E9
| 573111 ||  || — || November 24, 2008 || Kitt Peak || Spacewatch ||  || align=right | 1.9 km || 
|-id=112 bgcolor=#fefefe
| 573112 ||  || — || August 22, 2001 || Haleakala || AMOS ||  || align=right data-sort-value="0.67" | 670 m || 
|-id=113 bgcolor=#fefefe
| 573113 ||  || — || December 4, 2008 || Mount Lemmon || Mount Lemmon Survey ||  || align=right data-sort-value="0.78" | 780 m || 
|-id=114 bgcolor=#E9E9E9
| 573114 ||  || — || December 4, 2008 || Mount Lemmon || Mount Lemmon Survey ||  || align=right | 2.5 km || 
|-id=115 bgcolor=#fefefe
| 573115 ||  || — || October 29, 2008 || Kitt Peak || Spacewatch ||  || align=right data-sort-value="0.93" | 930 m || 
|-id=116 bgcolor=#fefefe
| 573116 ||  || — || December 4, 2008 || Mount Lemmon || Mount Lemmon Survey ||  || align=right data-sort-value="0.62" | 620 m || 
|-id=117 bgcolor=#E9E9E9
| 573117 ||  || — || December 15, 2004 || Kitt Peak || Spacewatch ||  || align=right | 2.5 km || 
|-id=118 bgcolor=#fefefe
| 573118 ||  || — || October 25, 2001 || Apache Point || SDSS Collaboration ||  || align=right data-sort-value="0.74" | 740 m || 
|-id=119 bgcolor=#E9E9E9
| 573119 ||  || — || December 1, 2008 || Kitt Peak || Spacewatch ||  || align=right | 1.7 km || 
|-id=120 bgcolor=#E9E9E9
| 573120 ||  || — || December 2, 2008 || Kitt Peak || Spacewatch ||  || align=right | 2.0 km || 
|-id=121 bgcolor=#fefefe
| 573121 ||  || — || October 27, 2008 || Kitt Peak || Spacewatch ||  || align=right data-sort-value="0.60" | 600 m || 
|-id=122 bgcolor=#E9E9E9
| 573122 ||  || — || September 21, 2003 || Palomar || NEAT ||  || align=right | 2.0 km || 
|-id=123 bgcolor=#d6d6d6
| 573123 ||  || — || September 26, 2000 || Kitt Peak || Spacewatch || 7:4 || align=right | 2.5 km || 
|-id=124 bgcolor=#E9E9E9
| 573124 ||  || — || December 3, 2008 || Kitt Peak || Spacewatch ||  || align=right | 1.8 km || 
|-id=125 bgcolor=#d6d6d6
| 573125 ||  || — || December 7, 2008 || Mount Lemmon || Mount Lemmon Survey ||  || align=right | 2.5 km || 
|-id=126 bgcolor=#E9E9E9
| 573126 ||  || — || December 6, 2008 || Kitt Peak || Spacewatch ||  || align=right | 2.3 km || 
|-id=127 bgcolor=#fefefe
| 573127 ||  || — || December 2, 2008 || Mount Lemmon || Mount Lemmon Survey ||  || align=right | 1.1 km || 
|-id=128 bgcolor=#d6d6d6
| 573128 ||  || — || May 12, 2005 || Mount Lemmon || Mount Lemmon Survey ||  || align=right | 3.6 km || 
|-id=129 bgcolor=#fefefe
| 573129 ||  || — || December 5, 2008 || Mount Lemmon || Mount Lemmon Survey ||  || align=right data-sort-value="0.94" | 940 m || 
|-id=130 bgcolor=#E9E9E9
| 573130 ||  || — || September 18, 2017 || Haleakala || Pan-STARRS ||  || align=right | 1.7 km || 
|-id=131 bgcolor=#E9E9E9
| 573131 ||  || — || December 4, 2012 || Mount Lemmon || Mount Lemmon Survey ||  || align=right | 1.4 km || 
|-id=132 bgcolor=#fefefe
| 573132 ||  || — || December 1, 2008 || Mount Lemmon || Mount Lemmon Survey ||  || align=right data-sort-value="0.62" | 620 m || 
|-id=133 bgcolor=#E9E9E9
| 573133 ||  || — || December 2, 2008 || Kitt Peak || Spacewatch ||  || align=right | 1.2 km || 
|-id=134 bgcolor=#E9E9E9
| 573134 ||  || — || November 22, 2008 || Kitt Peak || Spacewatch ||  || align=right | 2.1 km || 
|-id=135 bgcolor=#fefefe
| 573135 ||  || — || December 4, 2008 || Kitt Peak || Spacewatch ||  || align=right data-sort-value="0.71" | 710 m || 
|-id=136 bgcolor=#E9E9E9
| 573136 ||  || — || December 5, 2008 || Kitt Peak || Spacewatch ||  || align=right | 1.6 km || 
|-id=137 bgcolor=#E9E9E9
| 573137 ||  || — || December 3, 2008 || Kitt Peak || Spacewatch ||  || align=right | 1.6 km || 
|-id=138 bgcolor=#d6d6d6
| 573138 ||  || — || December 19, 2008 || Socorro || LINEAR || Tj (2.89) || align=right | 3.1 km || 
|-id=139 bgcolor=#E9E9E9
| 573139 ||  || — || October 3, 2003 || Kitt Peak || Spacewatch ||  || align=right | 1.9 km || 
|-id=140 bgcolor=#d6d6d6
| 573140 ||  || — || December 22, 2008 || Dauban || C. Rinner, F. Kugel ||  || align=right | 2.3 km || 
|-id=141 bgcolor=#d6d6d6
| 573141 ||  || — || December 19, 2008 || Lulin || LUSS ||  || align=right | 2.7 km || 
|-id=142 bgcolor=#fefefe
| 573142 ||  || — || December 20, 2008 || Lulin || LUSS || H || align=right data-sort-value="0.68" | 680 m || 
|-id=143 bgcolor=#fefefe
| 573143 ||  || — || July 16, 2004 || Cerro Tololo || Cerro Tololo Obs. ||  || align=right data-sort-value="0.50" | 500 m || 
|-id=144 bgcolor=#E9E9E9
| 573144 ||  || — || December 22, 2008 || Catalina || CSS ||  || align=right | 2.5 km || 
|-id=145 bgcolor=#FA8072
| 573145 ||  || — || December 28, 2008 || Wildberg || R. Apitzsch ||  || align=right | 1.3 km || 
|-id=146 bgcolor=#fefefe
| 573146 ||  || — || December 28, 2008 || Piszkesteto || K. Sárneczky ||  || align=right data-sort-value="0.78" | 780 m || 
|-id=147 bgcolor=#E9E9E9
| 573147 ||  || — || December 29, 2008 || Piszkesteto || K. Sárneczky ||  || align=right | 2.0 km || 
|-id=148 bgcolor=#d6d6d6
| 573148 ||  || — || September 12, 2007 || Mount Lemmon || Mount Lemmon Survey || 7:4* || align=right | 3.2 km || 
|-id=149 bgcolor=#fefefe
| 573149 ||  || — || December 28, 2008 || Nazaret || G. Muler ||  || align=right | 1.1 km || 
|-id=150 bgcolor=#E9E9E9
| 573150 ||  || — || December 30, 2008 || Altschwendt || W. Ries ||  || align=right | 1.4 km || 
|-id=151 bgcolor=#fefefe
| 573151 ||  || — || December 31, 2008 || Catalina || CSS || H || align=right data-sort-value="0.65" | 650 m || 
|-id=152 bgcolor=#d6d6d6
| 573152 ||  || — || December 22, 2008 || Kitt Peak || Spacewatch ||  || align=right | 3.1 km || 
|-id=153 bgcolor=#d6d6d6
| 573153 ||  || — || December 23, 2008 || Calar Alto || F. Hormuth ||  || align=right | 1.7 km || 
|-id=154 bgcolor=#fefefe
| 573154 ||  || — || December 29, 2008 || Mount Lemmon || Mount Lemmon Survey ||  || align=right data-sort-value="0.99" | 990 m || 
|-id=155 bgcolor=#fefefe
| 573155 ||  || — || December 29, 2008 || Mount Lemmon || Mount Lemmon Survey ||  || align=right data-sort-value="0.45" | 450 m || 
|-id=156 bgcolor=#d6d6d6
| 573156 ||  || — || December 29, 2008 || Mount Lemmon || Mount Lemmon Survey ||  || align=right | 2.0 km || 
|-id=157 bgcolor=#d6d6d6
| 573157 ||  || — || December 29, 2008 || Mount Lemmon || Mount Lemmon Survey ||  || align=right | 2.1 km || 
|-id=158 bgcolor=#d6d6d6
| 573158 ||  || — || December 22, 2008 || Kitt Peak || Spacewatch ||  || align=right | 1.8 km || 
|-id=159 bgcolor=#E9E9E9
| 573159 ||  || — || December 29, 2008 || Mount Lemmon || Mount Lemmon Survey ||  || align=right | 1.5 km || 
|-id=160 bgcolor=#fefefe
| 573160 ||  || — || December 30, 2008 || Kitt Peak || Spacewatch ||  || align=right data-sort-value="0.52" | 520 m || 
|-id=161 bgcolor=#fefefe
| 573161 ||  || — || December 30, 2008 || Kitt Peak || Spacewatch ||  || align=right data-sort-value="0.52" | 520 m || 
|-id=162 bgcolor=#d6d6d6
| 573162 ||  || — || December 30, 2008 || Mount Lemmon || Mount Lemmon Survey ||  || align=right | 2.3 km || 
|-id=163 bgcolor=#d6d6d6
| 573163 ||  || — || December 30, 2008 || Mount Lemmon || Mount Lemmon Survey ||  || align=right | 2.2 km || 
|-id=164 bgcolor=#d6d6d6
| 573164 ||  || — || December 2, 2008 || Mount Lemmon || Mount Lemmon Survey ||  || align=right | 2.2 km || 
|-id=165 bgcolor=#fefefe
| 573165 ||  || — || November 24, 2008 || Mount Lemmon || Mount Lemmon Survey ||  || align=right | 1.2 km || 
|-id=166 bgcolor=#E9E9E9
| 573166 ||  || — || December 30, 2008 || Mount Lemmon || Mount Lemmon Survey ||  || align=right | 1.4 km || 
|-id=167 bgcolor=#d6d6d6
| 573167 ||  || — || November 21, 2008 || Mount Lemmon || Mount Lemmon Survey ||  || align=right | 2.1 km || 
|-id=168 bgcolor=#fefefe
| 573168 ||  || — || February 13, 2002 || Kitt Peak || Spacewatch ||  || align=right data-sort-value="0.74" | 740 m || 
|-id=169 bgcolor=#fefefe
| 573169 ||  || — || December 29, 2008 || Mount Lemmon || Mount Lemmon Survey ||  || align=right data-sort-value="0.67" | 670 m || 
|-id=170 bgcolor=#fefefe
| 573170 ||  || — || December 29, 2008 || Mount Lemmon || Mount Lemmon Survey || H || align=right data-sort-value="0.62" | 620 m || 
|-id=171 bgcolor=#E9E9E9
| 573171 ||  || — || December 30, 2008 || Kitt Peak || Spacewatch ||  || align=right | 1.6 km || 
|-id=172 bgcolor=#E9E9E9
| 573172 ||  || — || December 30, 2008 || Kitt Peak || Spacewatch ||  || align=right | 1.8 km || 
|-id=173 bgcolor=#fefefe
| 573173 ||  || — || December 30, 2008 || Kitt Peak || Spacewatch ||  || align=right data-sort-value="0.74" | 740 m || 
|-id=174 bgcolor=#fefefe
| 573174 ||  || — || October 15, 2004 || Mount Lemmon || Mount Lemmon Survey ||  || align=right data-sort-value="0.70" | 700 m || 
|-id=175 bgcolor=#fefefe
| 573175 ||  || — || December 30, 2008 || Mount Lemmon || Mount Lemmon Survey ||  || align=right data-sort-value="0.86" | 860 m || 
|-id=176 bgcolor=#E9E9E9
| 573176 ||  || — || October 13, 2016 || Haleakala || Pan-STARRS ||  || align=right | 1.6 km || 
|-id=177 bgcolor=#d6d6d6
| 573177 ||  || — || December 4, 2008 || Kitt Peak || Spacewatch ||  || align=right | 2.3 km || 
|-id=178 bgcolor=#fefefe
| 573178 ||  || — || December 29, 2008 || Kitt Peak || Spacewatch ||  || align=right data-sort-value="0.71" | 710 m || 
|-id=179 bgcolor=#fefefe
| 573179 ||  || — || December 29, 2008 || Kitt Peak || Spacewatch ||  || align=right data-sort-value="0.78" | 780 m || 
|-id=180 bgcolor=#fefefe
| 573180 ||  || — || December 21, 2008 || Mount Lemmon || Mount Lemmon Survey ||  || align=right data-sort-value="0.55" | 550 m || 
|-id=181 bgcolor=#d6d6d6
| 573181 ||  || — || December 29, 2008 || Kitt Peak || Spacewatch ||  || align=right | 1.9 km || 
|-id=182 bgcolor=#d6d6d6
| 573182 ||  || — || December 29, 2008 || Kitt Peak || Spacewatch ||  || align=right | 3.1 km || 
|-id=183 bgcolor=#fefefe
| 573183 ||  || — || December 29, 2008 || Kitt Peak || Spacewatch ||  || align=right data-sort-value="0.81" | 810 m || 
|-id=184 bgcolor=#fefefe
| 573184 ||  || — || December 29, 2008 || Kitt Peak || Spacewatch ||  || align=right data-sort-value="0.80" | 800 m || 
|-id=185 bgcolor=#E9E9E9
| 573185 ||  || — || December 21, 2008 || Mount Lemmon || Mount Lemmon Survey ||  || align=right | 1.3 km || 
|-id=186 bgcolor=#d6d6d6
| 573186 ||  || — || December 21, 2008 || Kitt Peak || Spacewatch ||  || align=right | 2.2 km || 
|-id=187 bgcolor=#fefefe
| 573187 ||  || — || July 8, 2007 || Lulin || LUSS || V || align=right data-sort-value="0.69" | 690 m || 
|-id=188 bgcolor=#fefefe
| 573188 ||  || — || October 3, 2008 || Mount Lemmon || Mount Lemmon Survey ||  || align=right data-sort-value="0.75" | 750 m || 
|-id=189 bgcolor=#fefefe
| 573189 ||  || — || December 22, 2008 || Mount Lemmon || Mount Lemmon Survey || V || align=right data-sort-value="0.51" | 510 m || 
|-id=190 bgcolor=#fefefe
| 573190 ||  || — || December 22, 2008 || Kitt Peak || Spacewatch ||  || align=right data-sort-value="0.77" | 770 m || 
|-id=191 bgcolor=#E9E9E9
| 573191 ||  || — || November 30, 2003 || Kitt Peak || Spacewatch ||  || align=right | 2.2 km || 
|-id=192 bgcolor=#fefefe
| 573192 ||  || — || December 31, 2008 || Kitt Peak || Spacewatch ||  || align=right data-sort-value="0.90" | 900 m || 
|-id=193 bgcolor=#d6d6d6
| 573193 ||  || — || September 14, 2007 || Mount Lemmon || Mount Lemmon Survey ||  || align=right | 2.1 km || 
|-id=194 bgcolor=#fefefe
| 573194 ||  || — || December 30, 2008 || Kitt Peak || Spacewatch ||  || align=right data-sort-value="0.54" | 540 m || 
|-id=195 bgcolor=#fefefe
| 573195 ||  || — || December 22, 2008 || Kitt Peak || Spacewatch ||  || align=right data-sort-value="0.65" | 650 m || 
|-id=196 bgcolor=#fefefe
| 573196 ||  || — || October 12, 2007 || Anderson Mesa || LONEOS ||  || align=right | 1.0 km || 
|-id=197 bgcolor=#fefefe
| 573197 ||  || — || December 22, 2008 || Kitt Peak || Spacewatch ||  || align=right data-sort-value="0.64" | 640 m || 
|-id=198 bgcolor=#E9E9E9
| 573198 ||  || — || October 1, 2003 || Anderson Mesa || LONEOS ||  || align=right | 2.5 km || 
|-id=199 bgcolor=#d6d6d6
| 573199 ||  || — || November 30, 2008 || Mount Lemmon || Mount Lemmon Survey ||  || align=right | 1.9 km || 
|-id=200 bgcolor=#E9E9E9
| 573200 ||  || — || December 28, 2008 || Piszkesteto || K. Sárneczky ||  || align=right | 2.0 km || 
|}

573201–573300 

|-bgcolor=#d6d6d6
| 573201 ||  || — || December 21, 2008 || Mount Lemmon || Mount Lemmon Survey ||  || align=right | 1.7 km || 
|-id=202 bgcolor=#fefefe
| 573202 ||  || — || December 22, 2008 || Mount Lemmon || Mount Lemmon Survey ||  || align=right data-sort-value="0.63" | 630 m || 
|-id=203 bgcolor=#fefefe
| 573203 ||  || — || January 21, 2002 || Kitt Peak || Spacewatch ||  || align=right data-sort-value="0.59" | 590 m || 
|-id=204 bgcolor=#fefefe
| 573204 ||  || — || December 31, 2008 || Mount Lemmon || Mount Lemmon Survey ||  || align=right data-sort-value="0.64" | 640 m || 
|-id=205 bgcolor=#d6d6d6
| 573205 ||  || — || December 21, 2008 || Mount Lemmon || Mount Lemmon Survey ||  || align=right | 2.3 km || 
|-id=206 bgcolor=#E9E9E9
| 573206 ||  || — || December 26, 2008 || Nyukasa || H. Kurosaki, A. Nakajima ||  || align=right | 3.0 km || 
|-id=207 bgcolor=#d6d6d6
| 573207 ||  || — || December 29, 2008 || Kitt Peak || Spacewatch ||  || align=right | 2.0 km || 
|-id=208 bgcolor=#E9E9E9
| 573208 ||  || — || December 20, 2008 || Mount Lemmon || Mount Lemmon Survey ||  || align=right | 1.9 km || 
|-id=209 bgcolor=#d6d6d6
| 573209 ||  || — || December 22, 2008 || Kitt Peak || Spacewatch ||  || align=right | 2.0 km || 
|-id=210 bgcolor=#fefefe
| 573210 ||  || — || December 21, 2008 || Mount Lemmon || Mount Lemmon Survey ||  || align=right data-sort-value="0.82" | 820 m || 
|-id=211 bgcolor=#fefefe
| 573211 ||  || — || December 21, 2008 || Kitt Peak || Spacewatch ||  || align=right data-sort-value="0.57" | 570 m || 
|-id=212 bgcolor=#fefefe
| 573212 ||  || — || December 21, 2008 || Kitt Peak || Spacewatch ||  || align=right data-sort-value="0.76" | 760 m || 
|-id=213 bgcolor=#E9E9E9
| 573213 ||  || — || May 3, 2016 || Haleakala || Pan-STARRS ||  || align=right | 2.3 km || 
|-id=214 bgcolor=#E9E9E9
| 573214 ||  || — || June 20, 2015 || Haleakala || Pan-STARRS ||  || align=right | 1.2 km || 
|-id=215 bgcolor=#d6d6d6
| 573215 ||  || — || December 21, 2008 || Mount Lemmon || Mount Lemmon Survey ||  || align=right | 1.9 km || 
|-id=216 bgcolor=#fefefe
| 573216 ||  || — || December 31, 2008 || Kitt Peak || Spacewatch ||  || align=right data-sort-value="0.56" | 560 m || 
|-id=217 bgcolor=#E9E9E9
| 573217 ||  || — || December 21, 2008 || Kitt Peak || Spacewatch ||  || align=right | 2.2 km || 
|-id=218 bgcolor=#d6d6d6
| 573218 ||  || — || December 31, 2008 || Catalina || CSS ||  || align=right | 2.4 km || 
|-id=219 bgcolor=#E9E9E9
| 573219 ||  || — || January 21, 2014 || Mount Lemmon || Mount Lemmon Survey ||  || align=right | 1.9 km || 
|-id=220 bgcolor=#d6d6d6
| 573220 ||  || — || December 21, 2008 || Kitt Peak || Spacewatch ||  || align=right | 2.4 km || 
|-id=221 bgcolor=#d6d6d6
| 573221 ||  || — || December 29, 2008 || Kitt Peak || Spacewatch ||  || align=right | 2.2 km || 
|-id=222 bgcolor=#d6d6d6
| 573222 ||  || — || December 29, 2008 || Kitt Peak || Spacewatch ||  || align=right | 1.7 km || 
|-id=223 bgcolor=#fefefe
| 573223 ||  || — || December 30, 2008 || Kitt Peak || Spacewatch ||  || align=right data-sort-value="0.58" | 580 m || 
|-id=224 bgcolor=#fefefe
| 573224 ||  || — || December 22, 2008 || Kitt Peak || Spacewatch ||  || align=right data-sort-value="0.59" | 590 m || 
|-id=225 bgcolor=#d6d6d6
| 573225 ||  || — || December 21, 2008 || Mount Lemmon || Mount Lemmon Survey ||  || align=right | 2.0 km || 
|-id=226 bgcolor=#d6d6d6
| 573226 ||  || — || December 29, 2008 || Mount Lemmon || Mount Lemmon Survey ||  || align=right | 2.4 km || 
|-id=227 bgcolor=#fefefe
| 573227 ||  || — || March 4, 2005 || Mount Lemmon || Mount Lemmon Survey ||  || align=right data-sort-value="0.86" | 860 m || 
|-id=228 bgcolor=#fefefe
| 573228 ||  || — || January 2, 2009 || Nazaret || G. Muler ||  || align=right data-sort-value="0.83" | 830 m || 
|-id=229 bgcolor=#E9E9E9
| 573229 ||  || — || October 19, 2003 || Anderson Mesa || LONEOS ||  || align=right | 2.4 km || 
|-id=230 bgcolor=#d6d6d6
| 573230 ||  || — || January 1, 2009 || Kitt Peak || Spacewatch || KOR || align=right | 1.2 km || 
|-id=231 bgcolor=#d6d6d6
| 573231 ||  || — || January 1, 2009 || Kitt Peak || Spacewatch ||  || align=right | 3.1 km || 
|-id=232 bgcolor=#fefefe
| 573232 ||  || — || January 1, 2009 || Mount Lemmon || Mount Lemmon Survey ||  || align=right data-sort-value="0.69" | 690 m || 
|-id=233 bgcolor=#d6d6d6
| 573233 ||  || — || October 8, 2007 || Mount Lemmon || Mount Lemmon Survey ||  || align=right | 1.8 km || 
|-id=234 bgcolor=#d6d6d6
| 573234 ||  || — || November 22, 2008 || Mount Lemmon || Mount Lemmon Survey ||  || align=right | 2.0 km || 
|-id=235 bgcolor=#E9E9E9
| 573235 ||  || — || January 2, 2009 || Mount Lemmon || Mount Lemmon Survey ||  || align=right | 1.6 km || 
|-id=236 bgcolor=#E9E9E9
| 573236 ||  || — || January 2, 2009 || Mount Lemmon || Mount Lemmon Survey ||  || align=right | 1.9 km || 
|-id=237 bgcolor=#fefefe
| 573237 ||  || — || December 22, 2008 || Kitt Peak || Spacewatch || NYS || align=right data-sort-value="0.41" | 410 m || 
|-id=238 bgcolor=#E9E9E9
| 573238 ||  || — || January 3, 2009 || Kitt Peak || Spacewatch ||  || align=right | 2.8 km || 
|-id=239 bgcolor=#fefefe
| 573239 ||  || — || November 11, 2004 || Kitt Peak || Spacewatch ||  || align=right data-sort-value="0.76" | 760 m || 
|-id=240 bgcolor=#E9E9E9
| 573240 ||  || — || December 31, 2008 || Kitt Peak || Spacewatch ||  || align=right | 2.1 km || 
|-id=241 bgcolor=#E9E9E9
| 573241 ||  || — || January 15, 2009 || Kitt Peak || Spacewatch ||  || align=right | 2.1 km || 
|-id=242 bgcolor=#d6d6d6
| 573242 ||  || — || January 15, 2009 || Kitt Peak || Spacewatch ||  || align=right | 2.1 km || 
|-id=243 bgcolor=#E9E9E9
| 573243 ||  || — || January 15, 2009 || Kitt Peak || Spacewatch ||  || align=right | 1.1 km || 
|-id=244 bgcolor=#d6d6d6
| 573244 ||  || — || January 15, 2009 || Kitt Peak || Spacewatch ||  || align=right | 1.8 km || 
|-id=245 bgcolor=#d6d6d6
| 573245 ||  || — || October 18, 2007 || Kitt Peak || Spacewatch ||  || align=right | 1.9 km || 
|-id=246 bgcolor=#fefefe
| 573246 ||  || — || January 2, 2009 || Kitt Peak || Spacewatch || MAS || align=right data-sort-value="0.50" | 500 m || 
|-id=247 bgcolor=#E9E9E9
| 573247 ||  || — || January 2, 2009 || Kitt Peak || Spacewatch ||  || align=right | 2.0 km || 
|-id=248 bgcolor=#fefefe
| 573248 ||  || — || January 8, 2016 || Haleakala || Pan-STARRS ||  || align=right data-sort-value="0.63" | 630 m || 
|-id=249 bgcolor=#E9E9E9
| 573249 ||  || — || January 2, 2009 || Kitt Peak || Spacewatch ||  || align=right | 1.4 km || 
|-id=250 bgcolor=#fefefe
| 573250 ||  || — || September 23, 2011 || Haleakala || Pan-STARRS ||  || align=right data-sort-value="0.67" | 670 m || 
|-id=251 bgcolor=#fefefe
| 573251 ||  || — || September 21, 2011 || Haleakala || Pan-STARRS ||  || align=right data-sort-value="0.77" | 770 m || 
|-id=252 bgcolor=#E9E9E9
| 573252 ||  || — || November 17, 2012 || Mount Lemmon || Mount Lemmon Survey ||  || align=right | 1.4 km || 
|-id=253 bgcolor=#fefefe
| 573253 ||  || — || January 1, 2009 || Kitt Peak || Spacewatch ||  || align=right data-sort-value="0.51" | 510 m || 
|-id=254 bgcolor=#d6d6d6
| 573254 ||  || — || January 3, 2009 || Kitt Peak || Spacewatch ||  || align=right | 2.5 km || 
|-id=255 bgcolor=#E9E9E9
| 573255 ||  || — || January 2, 2009 || Mount Lemmon || Mount Lemmon Survey ||  || align=right | 1.7 km || 
|-id=256 bgcolor=#d6d6d6
| 573256 ||  || — || January 2, 2009 || Kitt Peak || Spacewatch ||  || align=right | 2.4 km || 
|-id=257 bgcolor=#d6d6d6
| 573257 ||  || — || January 16, 2009 || Mount Lemmon || Mount Lemmon Survey ||  || align=right | 2.2 km || 
|-id=258 bgcolor=#E9E9E9
| 573258 ||  || — || January 25, 2009 || Mayhill || A. Lowe ||  || align=right | 2.4 km || 
|-id=259 bgcolor=#fefefe
| 573259 ||  || — || January 25, 2009 || Wildberg || R. Apitzsch ||  || align=right data-sort-value="0.77" | 770 m || 
|-id=260 bgcolor=#d6d6d6
| 573260 ||  || — || December 31, 2008 || Kitt Peak || Spacewatch ||  || align=right | 2.0 km || 
|-id=261 bgcolor=#d6d6d6
| 573261 ||  || — || December 29, 2008 || Kitt Peak || Spacewatch ||  || align=right | 1.9 km || 
|-id=262 bgcolor=#d6d6d6
| 573262 ||  || — || December 31, 2008 || Kitt Peak || Spacewatch ||  || align=right | 2.5 km || 
|-id=263 bgcolor=#d6d6d6
| 573263 ||  || — || January 16, 2009 || Kitt Peak || Spacewatch ||  || align=right | 2.5 km || 
|-id=264 bgcolor=#d6d6d6
| 573264 ||  || — || January 16, 2009 || Kitt Peak || Spacewatch ||  || align=right | 2.0 km || 
|-id=265 bgcolor=#d6d6d6
| 573265 ||  || — || November 2, 2007 || Mount Lemmon || Mount Lemmon Survey || THM || align=right | 1.8 km || 
|-id=266 bgcolor=#E9E9E9
| 573266 ||  || — || January 16, 2009 || Kitt Peak || Spacewatch ||  || align=right | 1.0 km || 
|-id=267 bgcolor=#fefefe
| 573267 ||  || — || January 17, 2009 || Mount Lemmon || Mount Lemmon Survey ||  || align=right data-sort-value="0.74" | 740 m || 
|-id=268 bgcolor=#fefefe
| 573268 ||  || — || January 2, 2009 || Kitt Peak || Spacewatch ||  || align=right data-sort-value="0.90" | 900 m || 
|-id=269 bgcolor=#fefefe
| 573269 ||  || — || April 16, 2004 || Apache Point || SDSS Collaboration || H || align=right data-sort-value="0.50" | 500 m || 
|-id=270 bgcolor=#d6d6d6
| 573270 ||  || — || January 20, 2009 || Catalina || CSS ||  || align=right | 3.1 km || 
|-id=271 bgcolor=#fefefe
| 573271 ||  || — || January 20, 2009 || Kitt Peak || Spacewatch ||  || align=right data-sort-value="0.91" | 910 m || 
|-id=272 bgcolor=#d6d6d6
| 573272 ||  || — || September 26, 2006 || Kitt Peak || Spacewatch ||  || align=right | 3.1 km || 
|-id=273 bgcolor=#fefefe
| 573273 ||  || — || January 21, 2009 || Dauban || C. Rinner, F. Kugel ||  || align=right data-sort-value="0.72" | 720 m || 
|-id=274 bgcolor=#d6d6d6
| 573274 ||  || — || January 30, 2009 || Wildberg || R. Apitzsch ||  || align=right | 2.5 km || 
|-id=275 bgcolor=#fefefe
| 573275 ||  || — || February 1, 2009 || Kitt Peak || Spacewatch || NYS || align=right data-sort-value="0.55" | 550 m || 
|-id=276 bgcolor=#d6d6d6
| 573276 ||  || — || January 25, 2009 || Kitt Peak || Spacewatch ||  || align=right | 2.5 km || 
|-id=277 bgcolor=#fefefe
| 573277 ||  || — || January 25, 2009 || Kitt Peak || Spacewatch ||  || align=right data-sort-value="0.69" | 690 m || 
|-id=278 bgcolor=#d6d6d6
| 573278 ||  || — || January 25, 2009 || Kitt Peak || Spacewatch ||  || align=right | 2.3 km || 
|-id=279 bgcolor=#d6d6d6
| 573279 ||  || — || January 25, 2009 || Kitt Peak || Spacewatch || EOS || align=right | 1.6 km || 
|-id=280 bgcolor=#d6d6d6
| 573280 ||  || — || December 22, 2008 || Kitt Peak || Spacewatch ||  || align=right | 2.4 km || 
|-id=281 bgcolor=#fefefe
| 573281 ||  || — || January 30, 2009 || Mount Lemmon || Mount Lemmon Survey ||  || align=right data-sort-value="0.56" | 560 m || 
|-id=282 bgcolor=#fefefe
| 573282 ||  || — || January 31, 2009 || Mount Lemmon || Mount Lemmon Survey ||  || align=right data-sort-value="0.79" | 790 m || 
|-id=283 bgcolor=#d6d6d6
| 573283 ||  || — || December 22, 2008 || Kitt Peak || Spacewatch ||  || align=right | 2.8 km || 
|-id=284 bgcolor=#d6d6d6
| 573284 ||  || — || January 2, 2009 || Mount Lemmon || Mount Lemmon Survey ||  || align=right | 2.2 km || 
|-id=285 bgcolor=#d6d6d6
| 573285 ||  || — || January 3, 2009 || Kitt Peak || Spacewatch ||  || align=right | 1.8 km || 
|-id=286 bgcolor=#d6d6d6
| 573286 ||  || — || January 20, 2009 || Kitt Peak || Spacewatch ||  || align=right | 2.5 km || 
|-id=287 bgcolor=#E9E9E9
| 573287 ||  || — || January 29, 2009 || Kitt Peak || Spacewatch ||  || align=right | 2.0 km || 
|-id=288 bgcolor=#fefefe
| 573288 ||  || — || January 29, 2009 || Mount Lemmon || Mount Lemmon Survey ||  || align=right data-sort-value="0.85" | 850 m || 
|-id=289 bgcolor=#E9E9E9
| 573289 ||  || — || November 8, 2008 || Mount Lemmon || Mount Lemmon Survey ||  || align=right | 2.1 km || 
|-id=290 bgcolor=#d6d6d6
| 573290 ||  || — || January 29, 2009 || Kitt Peak || Spacewatch || EOS || align=right | 1.3 km || 
|-id=291 bgcolor=#d6d6d6
| 573291 ||  || — || January 15, 2009 || Kitt Peak || Spacewatch ||  || align=right | 2.0 km || 
|-id=292 bgcolor=#d6d6d6
| 573292 ||  || — || January 29, 2009 || Kitt Peak || Spacewatch ||  || align=right | 2.6 km || 
|-id=293 bgcolor=#E9E9E9
| 573293 ||  || — || September 10, 2007 || Kitt Peak || Spacewatch ||  || align=right | 1.3 km || 
|-id=294 bgcolor=#d6d6d6
| 573294 ||  || — || November 5, 2002 || Palomar || NEAT ||  || align=right | 2.1 km || 
|-id=295 bgcolor=#d6d6d6
| 573295 ||  || — || January 31, 2009 || Kitt Peak || Spacewatch ||  || align=right | 2.2 km || 
|-id=296 bgcolor=#fefefe
| 573296 ||  || — || December 31, 2008 || Mount Lemmon || Mount Lemmon Survey || H || align=right data-sort-value="0.45" | 450 m || 
|-id=297 bgcolor=#d6d6d6
| 573297 ||  || — || January 25, 2009 || Cerro Burek || Alianza S4 Obs. ||  || align=right | 2.8 km || 
|-id=298 bgcolor=#d6d6d6
| 573298 ||  || — || January 31, 2009 || Kitt Peak || Spacewatch ||  || align=right | 2.3 km || 
|-id=299 bgcolor=#d6d6d6
| 573299 ||  || — || January 16, 2009 || Kitt Peak || Spacewatch ||  || align=right | 2.0 km || 
|-id=300 bgcolor=#fefefe
| 573300 ||  || — || January 20, 2009 || Kitt Peak || Spacewatch ||  || align=right data-sort-value="0.55" | 550 m || 
|}

573301–573400 

|-bgcolor=#d6d6d6
| 573301 ||  || — || January 31, 2009 || Kitt Peak || Spacewatch ||  || align=right | 1.8 km || 
|-id=302 bgcolor=#d6d6d6
| 573302 ||  || — || January 25, 2009 || Kitt Peak || Spacewatch ||  || align=right | 2.4 km || 
|-id=303 bgcolor=#fefefe
| 573303 ||  || — || January 25, 2009 || Kitt Peak || Spacewatch ||  || align=right data-sort-value="0.67" | 670 m || 
|-id=304 bgcolor=#fefefe
| 573304 ||  || — || June 7, 2004 || Palomar || NEAT || H || align=right data-sort-value="0.85" | 850 m || 
|-id=305 bgcolor=#FA8072
| 573305 ||  || — || January 29, 2009 || Catalina || CSS ||  || align=right data-sort-value="0.37" | 370 m || 
|-id=306 bgcolor=#fefefe
| 573306 ||  || — || January 16, 2009 || Mount Lemmon || Mount Lemmon Survey ||  || align=right data-sort-value="0.68" | 680 m || 
|-id=307 bgcolor=#fefefe
| 573307 ||  || — || January 29, 2009 || Mount Lemmon || Mount Lemmon Survey || H || align=right data-sort-value="0.61" | 610 m || 
|-id=308 bgcolor=#fefefe
| 573308 ||  || — || January 16, 2009 || Mount Lemmon || Mount Lemmon Survey ||  || align=right data-sort-value="0.82" | 820 m || 
|-id=309 bgcolor=#fefefe
| 573309 ||  || — || January 25, 2009 || Kitt Peak || Spacewatch ||  || align=right data-sort-value="0.58" | 580 m || 
|-id=310 bgcolor=#d6d6d6
| 573310 ||  || — || August 18, 2006 || Kitt Peak || Spacewatch ||  || align=right | 2.8 km || 
|-id=311 bgcolor=#d6d6d6
| 573311 ||  || — || January 31, 2009 || Mount Lemmon || Mount Lemmon Survey ||  || align=right | 3.0 km || 
|-id=312 bgcolor=#d6d6d6
| 573312 ||  || — || January 1, 2014 || Kitt Peak || Spacewatch ||  || align=right | 1.9 km || 
|-id=313 bgcolor=#d6d6d6
| 573313 ||  || — || January 16, 2009 || Kitt Peak || Spacewatch ||  || align=right | 2.4 km || 
|-id=314 bgcolor=#d6d6d6
| 573314 ||  || — || January 22, 2015 || Haleakala || Pan-STARRS ||  || align=right | 2.8 km || 
|-id=315 bgcolor=#E9E9E9
| 573315 ||  || — || September 16, 2012 || Catalina || CSS ||  || align=right | 2.2 km || 
|-id=316 bgcolor=#fefefe
| 573316 ||  || — || September 4, 2014 || Haleakala || Pan-STARRS ||  || align=right data-sort-value="0.54" | 540 m || 
|-id=317 bgcolor=#fefefe
| 573317 ||  || — || January 16, 2009 || Kitt Peak || Spacewatch ||  || align=right data-sort-value="0.48" | 480 m || 
|-id=318 bgcolor=#d6d6d6
| 573318 ||  || — || January 25, 2009 || Kitt Peak || Spacewatch ||  || align=right | 2.4 km || 
|-id=319 bgcolor=#fefefe
| 573319 ||  || — || January 28, 2009 || Catalina || CSS ||  || align=right data-sort-value="0.75" | 750 m || 
|-id=320 bgcolor=#d6d6d6
| 573320 ||  || — || January 25, 2009 || Kitt Peak || Spacewatch ||  || align=right | 2.7 km || 
|-id=321 bgcolor=#d6d6d6
| 573321 ||  || — || August 26, 2012 || Haleakala || Pan-STARRS ||  || align=right | 2.2 km || 
|-id=322 bgcolor=#fefefe
| 573322 ||  || — || January 7, 2009 || Kitt Peak || Spacewatch ||  || align=right data-sort-value="0.57" | 570 m || 
|-id=323 bgcolor=#d6d6d6
| 573323 ||  || — || January 20, 2009 || Kitt Peak || Spacewatch ||  || align=right | 2.5 km || 
|-id=324 bgcolor=#d6d6d6
| 573324 ||  || — || August 19, 2001 || Cerro Tololo || Cerro Tololo Obs. ||  || align=right | 2.2 km || 
|-id=325 bgcolor=#E9E9E9
| 573325 ||  || — || September 2, 2002 || Kitt Peak || Spacewatch ||  || align=right | 1.5 km || 
|-id=326 bgcolor=#d6d6d6
| 573326 ||  || — || January 18, 2009 || Kitt Peak || Spacewatch ||  || align=right | 2.2 km || 
|-id=327 bgcolor=#fefefe
| 573327 ||  || — || March 18, 2013 || Kitt Peak || Spacewatch ||  || align=right data-sort-value="0.59" | 590 m || 
|-id=328 bgcolor=#d6d6d6
| 573328 ||  || — || January 21, 2009 || Mount Lemmon || Mount Lemmon Survey ||  || align=right | 2.5 km || 
|-id=329 bgcolor=#fefefe
| 573329 ||  || — || January 31, 2009 || Mount Lemmon || Mount Lemmon Survey ||  || align=right data-sort-value="0.73" | 730 m || 
|-id=330 bgcolor=#fefefe
| 573330 ||  || — || January 18, 2009 || Kitt Peak || Spacewatch || H || align=right data-sort-value="0.42" | 420 m || 
|-id=331 bgcolor=#d6d6d6
| 573331 ||  || — || January 16, 2009 || Mount Lemmon || Mount Lemmon Survey ||  || align=right | 2.0 km || 
|-id=332 bgcolor=#E9E9E9
| 573332 ||  || — || January 18, 2009 || Kitt Peak || Spacewatch ||  || align=right | 1.8 km || 
|-id=333 bgcolor=#fefefe
| 573333 ||  || — || February 2, 2009 || Moletai || K. Černis, J. Zdanavičius ||  || align=right data-sort-value="0.82" | 820 m || 
|-id=334 bgcolor=#d6d6d6
| 573334 ||  || — || February 12, 2009 || Calar Alto || F. Hormuth, J. C. Datson ||  || align=right | 2.7 km || 
|-id=335 bgcolor=#fefefe
| 573335 ||  || — || January 18, 2009 || Kitt Peak || Spacewatch ||  || align=right data-sort-value="0.74" | 740 m || 
|-id=336 bgcolor=#E9E9E9
| 573336 ||  || — || October 9, 2007 || Catalina || CSS ||  || align=right | 2.6 km || 
|-id=337 bgcolor=#d6d6d6
| 573337 ||  || — || August 28, 2006 || Kitt Peak || Spacewatch ||  || align=right | 2.4 km || 
|-id=338 bgcolor=#d6d6d6
| 573338 ||  || — || February 1, 2009 || Mount Lemmon || Mount Lemmon Survey ||  || align=right | 3.1 km || 
|-id=339 bgcolor=#d6d6d6
| 573339 ||  || — || February 1, 2009 || Mount Lemmon || Mount Lemmon Survey ||  || align=right | 2.2 km || 
|-id=340 bgcolor=#d6d6d6
| 573340 ||  || — || October 9, 2007 || Catalina || CSS ||  || align=right | 3.1 km || 
|-id=341 bgcolor=#d6d6d6
| 573341 ||  || — || February 3, 2009 || Mount Lemmon || Mount Lemmon Survey ||  || align=right | 2.3 km || 
|-id=342 bgcolor=#d6d6d6
| 573342 ||  || — || November 4, 2007 || Kitt Peak || Spacewatch ||  || align=right | 2.3 km || 
|-id=343 bgcolor=#d6d6d6
| 573343 ||  || — || January 15, 2009 || Kitt Peak || Spacewatch ||  || align=right | 2.7 km || 
|-id=344 bgcolor=#d6d6d6
| 573344 ||  || — || January 3, 2009 || Mount Lemmon || Mount Lemmon Survey ||  || align=right | 2.2 km || 
|-id=345 bgcolor=#d6d6d6
| 573345 ||  || — || February 1, 2009 || Kitt Peak || Spacewatch ||  || align=right | 2.1 km || 
|-id=346 bgcolor=#d6d6d6
| 573346 ||  || — || February 1, 2009 || Kitt Peak || Spacewatch ||  || align=right | 2.0 km || 
|-id=347 bgcolor=#d6d6d6
| 573347 ||  || — || February 1, 2009 || Kitt Peak || Spacewatch ||  || align=right | 2.3 km || 
|-id=348 bgcolor=#fefefe
| 573348 ||  || — || November 10, 2004 || Kitt Peak || Spacewatch ||  || align=right | 1.1 km || 
|-id=349 bgcolor=#fefefe
| 573349 ||  || — || January 2, 2009 || Kitt Peak || Spacewatch ||  || align=right data-sort-value="0.93" | 930 m || 
|-id=350 bgcolor=#d6d6d6
| 573350 ||  || — || January 31, 2009 || Mount Lemmon || Mount Lemmon Survey ||  || align=right | 2.9 km || 
|-id=351 bgcolor=#fefefe
| 573351 ||  || — || February 14, 2009 || Mount Lemmon || Mount Lemmon Survey ||  || align=right data-sort-value="0.59" | 590 m || 
|-id=352 bgcolor=#d6d6d6
| 573352 ||  || — || February 3, 2009 || Kitt Peak || Spacewatch ||  || align=right | 2.3 km || 
|-id=353 bgcolor=#d6d6d6
| 573353 ||  || — || February 2, 2009 || Kitt Peak || Spacewatch ||  || align=right | 2.0 km || 
|-id=354 bgcolor=#d6d6d6
| 573354 ||  || — || February 20, 2014 || Mount Lemmon || Mount Lemmon Survey ||  || align=right | 1.9 km || 
|-id=355 bgcolor=#d6d6d6
| 573355 ||  || — || February 3, 2009 || Kitt Peak || Spacewatch ||  || align=right | 2.4 km || 
|-id=356 bgcolor=#d6d6d6
| 573356 ||  || — || February 4, 2009 || Mount Lemmon || Mount Lemmon Survey ||  || align=right | 1.9 km || 
|-id=357 bgcolor=#fefefe
| 573357 ||  || — || March 13, 2013 || Mount Lemmon || Mount Lemmon Survey ||  || align=right data-sort-value="0.67" | 670 m || 
|-id=358 bgcolor=#fefefe
| 573358 ||  || — || February 1, 2009 || Catalina || CSS || H || align=right data-sort-value="0.85" | 850 m || 
|-id=359 bgcolor=#d6d6d6
| 573359 ||  || — || October 26, 2012 || Mount Lemmon || Mount Lemmon Survey ||  || align=right | 2.2 km || 
|-id=360 bgcolor=#d6d6d6
| 573360 ||  || — || February 2, 2009 || Kitt Peak || Spacewatch ||  || align=right | 2.3 km || 
|-id=361 bgcolor=#d6d6d6
| 573361 ||  || — || February 14, 2009 || Kitt Peak || Spacewatch ||  || align=right | 2.4 km || 
|-id=362 bgcolor=#fefefe
| 573362 ||  || — || February 2, 2009 || Catalina || CSS || H || align=right data-sort-value="0.70" | 700 m || 
|-id=363 bgcolor=#E9E9E9
| 573363 ||  || — || March 12, 2014 || Kitt Peak || Spacewatch ||  || align=right | 1.7 km || 
|-id=364 bgcolor=#fefefe
| 573364 ||  || — || October 1, 2011 || Kitt Peak || Spacewatch ||  || align=right data-sort-value="0.57" | 570 m || 
|-id=365 bgcolor=#d6d6d6
| 573365 ||  || — || February 17, 2004 || Kitt Peak || Spacewatch ||  || align=right | 2.2 km || 
|-id=366 bgcolor=#d6d6d6
| 573366 ||  || — || February 3, 2009 || Kitt Peak || Spacewatch ||  || align=right | 1.6 km || 
|-id=367 bgcolor=#d6d6d6
| 573367 ||  || — || February 16, 2009 || Dauban || C. Rinner, F. Kugel ||  || align=right | 2.0 km || 
|-id=368 bgcolor=#d6d6d6
| 573368 ||  || — || November 13, 2007 || Mount Lemmon || Mount Lemmon Survey ||  || align=right | 2.1 km || 
|-id=369 bgcolor=#d6d6d6
| 573369 ||  || — || February 16, 2009 || Kitt Peak || Spacewatch ||  || align=right | 3.3 km || 
|-id=370 bgcolor=#d6d6d6
| 573370 ||  || — || January 30, 2009 || Mount Lemmon || Mount Lemmon Survey ||  || align=right | 3.8 km || 
|-id=371 bgcolor=#d6d6d6
| 573371 ||  || — || April 12, 2004 || Kitt Peak || Spacewatch ||  || align=right | 2.7 km || 
|-id=372 bgcolor=#d6d6d6
| 573372 ||  || — || January 29, 2009 || Kitt Peak || Spacewatch ||  || align=right | 2.0 km || 
|-id=373 bgcolor=#d6d6d6
| 573373 ||  || — || March 15, 2004 || Kitt Peak || Spacewatch ||  || align=right | 2.0 km || 
|-id=374 bgcolor=#d6d6d6
| 573374 ||  || — || September 8, 2000 || Kitt Peak || Spacewatch ||  || align=right | 2.5 km || 
|-id=375 bgcolor=#fefefe
| 573375 ||  || — || February 23, 2009 || Calar Alto || F. Hormuth ||  || align=right data-sort-value="0.57" | 570 m || 
|-id=376 bgcolor=#d6d6d6
| 573376 ||  || — || February 20, 2009 || Kitt Peak || Spacewatch ||  || align=right | 2.5 km || 
|-id=377 bgcolor=#d6d6d6
| 573377 ||  || — || February 20, 2009 || Kitt Peak || Spacewatch ||  || align=right | 2.1 km || 
|-id=378 bgcolor=#fefefe
| 573378 ||  || — || January 16, 2009 || Kitt Peak || Spacewatch || MAS || align=right data-sort-value="0.63" | 630 m || 
|-id=379 bgcolor=#fefefe
| 573379 ||  || — || February 20, 2009 || Dauban || C. Rinner, F. Kugel ||  || align=right data-sort-value="0.74" | 740 m || 
|-id=380 bgcolor=#d6d6d6
| 573380 ||  || — || February 26, 2009 || Kachina || J. Hobart ||  || align=right | 3.2 km || 
|-id=381 bgcolor=#d6d6d6
| 573381 ||  || — || February 27, 2009 || Piszkesteto || K. Sárneczky ||  || align=right | 2.4 km || 
|-id=382 bgcolor=#d6d6d6
| 573382 ||  || — || February 22, 2009 || Kitt Peak || Spacewatch ||  || align=right | 2.8 km || 
|-id=383 bgcolor=#E9E9E9
| 573383 ||  || — || October 15, 2007 || Mount Lemmon || Mount Lemmon Survey ||  || align=right | 1.8 km || 
|-id=384 bgcolor=#d6d6d6
| 573384 ||  || — || February 1, 2009 || Mount Lemmon || Mount Lemmon Survey ||  || align=right | 2.7 km || 
|-id=385 bgcolor=#fefefe
| 573385 ||  || — || February 22, 2009 || Kitt Peak || Spacewatch || H || align=right data-sort-value="0.70" | 700 m || 
|-id=386 bgcolor=#fefefe
| 573386 ||  || — || February 22, 2009 || Kitt Peak || Spacewatch ||  || align=right data-sort-value="0.62" | 620 m || 
|-id=387 bgcolor=#d6d6d6
| 573387 ||  || — || February 22, 2009 || Kitt Peak || Spacewatch ||  || align=right | 2.4 km || 
|-id=388 bgcolor=#d6d6d6
| 573388 ||  || — || February 22, 2009 || Kitt Peak || Spacewatch ||  || align=right | 2.3 km || 
|-id=389 bgcolor=#fefefe
| 573389 ||  || — || February 3, 2009 || Kitt Peak || Spacewatch ||  || align=right data-sort-value="0.75" | 750 m || 
|-id=390 bgcolor=#d6d6d6
| 573390 ||  || — || January 18, 2004 || Kitt Peak || Spacewatch ||  || align=right | 2.2 km || 
|-id=391 bgcolor=#d6d6d6
| 573391 ||  || — || February 25, 2009 || Calar Alto || F. Hormuth ||  || align=right | 2.9 km || 
|-id=392 bgcolor=#d6d6d6
| 573392 ||  || — || August 27, 2006 || Kitt Peak || Spacewatch ||  || align=right | 2.3 km || 
|-id=393 bgcolor=#d6d6d6
| 573393 ||  || — || February 26, 2009 || Kitt Peak || Spacewatch ||  || align=right | 2.1 km || 
|-id=394 bgcolor=#d6d6d6
| 573394 ||  || — || February 26, 2009 || Kitt Peak || Spacewatch ||  || align=right | 2.9 km || 
|-id=395 bgcolor=#FA8072
| 573395 ||  || — || February 4, 2009 || Catalina || CSS ||  || align=right data-sort-value="0.74" | 740 m || 
|-id=396 bgcolor=#d6d6d6
| 573396 ||  || — || February 21, 2009 || Kitt Peak || Spacewatch ||  || align=right | 2.5 km || 
|-id=397 bgcolor=#d6d6d6
| 573397 ||  || — || September 29, 2005 || Mount Lemmon || Mount Lemmon Survey ||  || align=right | 2.5 km || 
|-id=398 bgcolor=#d6d6d6
| 573398 ||  || — || February 26, 2009 || Kitt Peak || Spacewatch ||  || align=right | 2.4 km || 
|-id=399 bgcolor=#d6d6d6
| 573399 ||  || — || August 29, 2006 || Kitt Peak || Spacewatch ||  || align=right | 2.5 km || 
|-id=400 bgcolor=#fefefe
| 573400 ||  || — || May 8, 2002 || Anderson Mesa || LONEOS ||  || align=right data-sort-value="0.77" | 770 m || 
|}

573401–573500 

|-bgcolor=#d6d6d6
| 573401 ||  || — || February 28, 2009 || Mount Lemmon || Mount Lemmon Survey ||  || align=right | 2.4 km || 
|-id=402 bgcolor=#d6d6d6
| 573402 ||  || — || February 26, 2009 || Kitt Peak || Spacewatch ||  || align=right | 2.4 km || 
|-id=403 bgcolor=#d6d6d6
| 573403 ||  || — || February 22, 2009 || Kitt Peak || Spacewatch ||  || align=right | 2.0 km || 
|-id=404 bgcolor=#d6d6d6
| 573404 ||  || — || February 26, 2009 || Kitt Peak || Spacewatch ||  || align=right | 2.4 km || 
|-id=405 bgcolor=#d6d6d6
| 573405 ||  || — || February 26, 2009 || Kitt Peak || Spacewatch ||  || align=right | 2.2 km || 
|-id=406 bgcolor=#d6d6d6
| 573406 ||  || — || February 26, 2009 || Kitt Peak || Spacewatch ||  || align=right | 2.9 km || 
|-id=407 bgcolor=#fefefe
| 573407 ||  || — || February 26, 2009 || Kitt Peak || Spacewatch ||  || align=right data-sort-value="0.65" | 650 m || 
|-id=408 bgcolor=#d6d6d6
| 573408 ||  || — || October 7, 1996 || Kitt Peak || Spacewatch ||  || align=right | 3.2 km || 
|-id=409 bgcolor=#fefefe
| 573409 ||  || — || February 26, 2009 || Mount Lemmon || Mount Lemmon Survey ||  || align=right data-sort-value="0.75" | 750 m || 
|-id=410 bgcolor=#fefefe
| 573410 ||  || — || February 26, 2009 || Kitt Peak || Spacewatch ||  || align=right data-sort-value="0.64" | 640 m || 
|-id=411 bgcolor=#fefefe
| 573411 ||  || — || February 4, 2009 || Mount Lemmon || Mount Lemmon Survey || MAS || align=right data-sort-value="0.65" | 650 m || 
|-id=412 bgcolor=#d6d6d6
| 573412 ||  || — || February 19, 2009 || Kitt Peak || Spacewatch ||  || align=right | 2.1 km || 
|-id=413 bgcolor=#d6d6d6
| 573413 ||  || — || February 27, 2009 || Kitt Peak || Spacewatch ||  || align=right | 2.6 km || 
|-id=414 bgcolor=#fefefe
| 573414 ||  || — || October 15, 2007 || Kitt Peak || Spacewatch ||  || align=right data-sort-value="0.79" | 790 m || 
|-id=415 bgcolor=#fefefe
| 573415 ||  || — || February 27, 2009 || Kitt Peak || Spacewatch ||  || align=right data-sort-value="0.68" | 680 m || 
|-id=416 bgcolor=#d6d6d6
| 573416 ||  || — || February 26, 2009 || Kitt Peak || Spacewatch ||  || align=right | 2.5 km || 
|-id=417 bgcolor=#d6d6d6
| 573417 ||  || — || August 31, 2005 || Kitt Peak || Spacewatch ||  || align=right | 2.3 km || 
|-id=418 bgcolor=#d6d6d6
| 573418 ||  || — || February 20, 2009 || Kitt Peak || Spacewatch ||  || align=right | 2.1 km || 
|-id=419 bgcolor=#fefefe
| 573419 ||  || — || February 21, 2009 || Kitt Peak || Spacewatch ||  || align=right data-sort-value="0.66" | 660 m || 
|-id=420 bgcolor=#fefefe
| 573420 ||  || — || January 17, 2009 || Mount Lemmon || Mount Lemmon Survey ||  || align=right data-sort-value="0.66" | 660 m || 
|-id=421 bgcolor=#E9E9E9
| 573421 ||  || — || February 20, 2009 || Kitt Peak || Spacewatch ||  || align=right | 1.1 km || 
|-id=422 bgcolor=#d6d6d6
| 573422 ||  || — || September 19, 2006 || Catalina || CSS ||  || align=right | 2.7 km || 
|-id=423 bgcolor=#d6d6d6
| 573423 ||  || — || February 20, 2014 || Mount Lemmon || Mount Lemmon Survey ||  || align=right | 2.6 km || 
|-id=424 bgcolor=#d6d6d6
| 573424 ||  || — || September 24, 2011 || Mount Lemmon || Mount Lemmon Survey ||  || align=right | 2.4 km || 
|-id=425 bgcolor=#d6d6d6
| 573425 ||  || — || February 26, 2014 || Haleakala || Pan-STARRS ||  || align=right | 2.2 km || 
|-id=426 bgcolor=#d6d6d6
| 573426 ||  || — || January 9, 2014 || Mount Lemmon || Mount Lemmon Survey ||  || align=right | 2.5 km || 
|-id=427 bgcolor=#d6d6d6
| 573427 ||  || — || February 20, 2009 || Kitt Peak || Spacewatch ||  || align=right | 2.9 km || 
|-id=428 bgcolor=#d6d6d6
| 573428 ||  || — || February 21, 2009 || Kitt Peak || Spacewatch ||  || align=right | 3.3 km || 
|-id=429 bgcolor=#fefefe
| 573429 ||  || — || April 16, 2013 || Haleakala || Pan-STARRS ||  || align=right data-sort-value="0.67" | 670 m || 
|-id=430 bgcolor=#d6d6d6
| 573430 ||  || — || May 13, 2015 || Mount Lemmon || Mount Lemmon Survey ||  || align=right | 2.1 km || 
|-id=431 bgcolor=#E9E9E9
| 573431 ||  || — || February 26, 2014 || Catalina || CSS ||  || align=right | 1.5 km || 
|-id=432 bgcolor=#d6d6d6
| 573432 ||  || — || February 20, 2009 || Kitt Peak || Spacewatch ||  || align=right | 2.5 km || 
|-id=433 bgcolor=#fefefe
| 573433 ||  || — || February 19, 2009 || Kitt Peak || Spacewatch ||  || align=right data-sort-value="0.52" | 520 m || 
|-id=434 bgcolor=#d6d6d6
| 573434 ||  || — || July 14, 2016 || Haleakala || Pan-STARRS ||  || align=right | 1.9 km || 
|-id=435 bgcolor=#d6d6d6
| 573435 ||  || — || February 26, 2009 || Kitt Peak || Spacewatch ||  || align=right | 1.7 km || 
|-id=436 bgcolor=#d6d6d6
| 573436 ||  || — || February 20, 2009 || Kitt Peak || Spacewatch ||  || align=right | 2.2 km || 
|-id=437 bgcolor=#fefefe
| 573437 ||  || — || February 28, 2009 || Kitt Peak || Spacewatch ||  || align=right data-sort-value="0.63" | 630 m || 
|-id=438 bgcolor=#E9E9E9
| 573438 ||  || — || February 28, 2009 || Mount Lemmon || Mount Lemmon Survey ||  || align=right | 1.7 km || 
|-id=439 bgcolor=#d6d6d6
| 573439 ||  || — || April 13, 2004 || Kitt Peak || Spacewatch ||  || align=right | 2.5 km || 
|-id=440 bgcolor=#d6d6d6
| 573440 ||  || — || March 1, 2009 || Kitt Peak || Spacewatch ||  || align=right | 2.4 km || 
|-id=441 bgcolor=#d6d6d6
| 573441 ||  || — || January 31, 2009 || Mount Lemmon || Mount Lemmon Survey ||  || align=right | 3.1 km || 
|-id=442 bgcolor=#d6d6d6
| 573442 ||  || — || March 2, 2009 || Mount Lemmon || Mount Lemmon Survey ||  || align=right | 2.1 km || 
|-id=443 bgcolor=#d6d6d6
| 573443 ||  || — || March 15, 2009 || Kitt Peak || Spacewatch ||  || align=right | 2.6 km || 
|-id=444 bgcolor=#fefefe
| 573444 ||  || — || February 1, 2009 || Kitt Peak || Spacewatch || NYS || align=right data-sort-value="0.59" | 590 m || 
|-id=445 bgcolor=#d6d6d6
| 573445 ||  || — || March 3, 2009 || Mount Lemmon || Mount Lemmon Survey ||  || align=right | 2.2 km || 
|-id=446 bgcolor=#d6d6d6
| 573446 ||  || — || March 3, 2009 || Kitt Peak || Spacewatch ||  || align=right | 3.1 km || 
|-id=447 bgcolor=#d6d6d6
| 573447 ||  || — || January 28, 2004 || Catalina || CSS ||  || align=right | 2.6 km || 
|-id=448 bgcolor=#fefefe
| 573448 ||  || — || March 1, 2009 || Mount Lemmon || Mount Lemmon Survey ||  || align=right data-sort-value="0.72" | 720 m || 
|-id=449 bgcolor=#fefefe
| 573449 ||  || — || March 2, 2009 || Mount Lemmon || Mount Lemmon Survey ||  || align=right data-sort-value="0.68" | 680 m || 
|-id=450 bgcolor=#fefefe
| 573450 ||  || — || July 6, 2014 || Haleakala || Pan-STARRS ||  || align=right data-sort-value="0.62" | 620 m || 
|-id=451 bgcolor=#d6d6d6
| 573451 ||  || — || August 9, 2016 || Haleakala || Pan-STARRS ||  || align=right | 2.8 km || 
|-id=452 bgcolor=#d6d6d6
| 573452 ||  || — || April 23, 2015 || Haleakala || Pan-STARRS ||  || align=right | 2.6 km || 
|-id=453 bgcolor=#fefefe
| 573453 ||  || — || August 15, 2017 || Haleakala || Pan-STARRS ||  || align=right data-sort-value="0.78" | 780 m || 
|-id=454 bgcolor=#d6d6d6
| 573454 ||  || — || July 28, 2011 || Flagstaff || L. H. Wasserman ||  || align=right | 2.2 km || 
|-id=455 bgcolor=#fefefe
| 573455 ||  || — || November 17, 2011 || Mount Lemmon || Mount Lemmon Survey ||  || align=right data-sort-value="0.49" | 490 m || 
|-id=456 bgcolor=#d6d6d6
| 573456 ||  || — || March 28, 2015 || Haleakala || Pan-STARRS ||  || align=right | 1.9 km || 
|-id=457 bgcolor=#fefefe
| 573457 ||  || — || July 17, 2013 || Haleakala || Pan-STARRS ||  || align=right data-sort-value="0.77" | 770 m || 
|-id=458 bgcolor=#fefefe
| 573458 ||  || — || February 22, 2009 || Kitt Peak || Spacewatch ||  || align=right data-sort-value="0.84" | 840 m || 
|-id=459 bgcolor=#d6d6d6
| 573459 ||  || — || August 1, 2017 || Haleakala || Pan-STARRS ||  || align=right | 2.5 km || 
|-id=460 bgcolor=#d6d6d6
| 573460 ||  || — || January 7, 2014 || Mount Lemmon || Mount Lemmon Survey ||  || align=right | 2.0 km || 
|-id=461 bgcolor=#d6d6d6
| 573461 ||  || — || December 30, 2013 || Mount Lemmon || Mount Lemmon Survey ||  || align=right | 2.2 km || 
|-id=462 bgcolor=#d6d6d6
| 573462 ||  || — || August 11, 2016 || Haleakala || Pan-STARRS ||  || align=right | 2.0 km || 
|-id=463 bgcolor=#d6d6d6
| 573463 ||  || — || October 18, 2012 || Haleakala || Pan-STARRS ||  || align=right | 2.2 km || 
|-id=464 bgcolor=#fefefe
| 573464 ||  || — || March 2, 2009 || Mount Lemmon || Mount Lemmon Survey ||  || align=right data-sort-value="0.70" | 700 m || 
|-id=465 bgcolor=#d6d6d6
| 573465 ||  || — || March 3, 2009 || Mount Lemmon || Mount Lemmon Survey ||  || align=right | 2.2 km || 
|-id=466 bgcolor=#d6d6d6
| 573466 ||  || — || March 1, 2009 || Kitt Peak || Spacewatch ||  || align=right | 2.2 km || 
|-id=467 bgcolor=#fefefe
| 573467 ||  || — || March 1, 2009 || Kitt Peak || Spacewatch ||  || align=right data-sort-value="0.58" | 580 m || 
|-id=468 bgcolor=#d6d6d6
| 573468 ||  || — || March 1, 2009 || Kitt Peak || Spacewatch ||  || align=right | 2.6 km || 
|-id=469 bgcolor=#d6d6d6
| 573469 ||  || — || March 3, 2009 || Kitt Peak || Spacewatch ||  || align=right | 2.2 km || 
|-id=470 bgcolor=#d6d6d6
| 573470 ||  || — || March 16, 2009 || Calvin-Rehoboth || L. A. Molnar ||  || align=right | 2.5 km || 
|-id=471 bgcolor=#d6d6d6
| 573471 ||  || — || September 21, 2001 || Apache Point || SDSS Collaboration ||  || align=right | 2.9 km || 
|-id=472 bgcolor=#d6d6d6
| 573472 ||  || — || December 4, 2007 || Mount Lemmon || Mount Lemmon Survey ||  || align=right | 3.1 km || 
|-id=473 bgcolor=#d6d6d6
| 573473 ||  || — || March 3, 2009 || Mount Lemmon || Mount Lemmon Survey ||  || align=right | 2.2 km || 
|-id=474 bgcolor=#d6d6d6
| 573474 ||  || — || March 3, 2009 || Mount Lemmon || Mount Lemmon Survey ||  || align=right | 1.8 km || 
|-id=475 bgcolor=#d6d6d6
| 573475 ||  || — || April 20, 2004 || Kitt Peak || Spacewatch ||  || align=right | 2.6 km || 
|-id=476 bgcolor=#d6d6d6
| 573476 ||  || — || March 22, 2009 || Catalina || CSS ||  || align=right | 2.8 km || 
|-id=477 bgcolor=#d6d6d6
| 573477 ||  || — || March 28, 2009 || Kitt Peak || Spacewatch ||  || align=right | 2.3 km || 
|-id=478 bgcolor=#d6d6d6
| 573478 ||  || — || March 29, 2009 || Bergisch Gladbach || W. Bickel ||  || align=right | 1.9 km || 
|-id=479 bgcolor=#d6d6d6
| 573479 ||  || — || August 18, 2006 || Kitt Peak || Spacewatch ||  || align=right | 2.1 km || 
|-id=480 bgcolor=#d6d6d6
| 573480 ||  || — || January 2, 2009 || Kitt Peak || Spacewatch ||  || align=right | 3.2 km || 
|-id=481 bgcolor=#d6d6d6
| 573481 ||  || — || October 22, 1995 || Kitt Peak || Spacewatch ||  || align=right | 2.6 km || 
|-id=482 bgcolor=#d6d6d6
| 573482 ||  || — || March 28, 2009 || Mount Lemmon || Mount Lemmon Survey ||  || align=right | 2.2 km || 
|-id=483 bgcolor=#fefefe
| 573483 ||  || — || March 28, 2009 || Mount Lemmon || Mount Lemmon Survey ||  || align=right data-sort-value="0.59" | 590 m || 
|-id=484 bgcolor=#fefefe
| 573484 ||  || — || September 10, 2007 || Mount Lemmon || Mount Lemmon Survey ||  || align=right data-sort-value="0.67" | 670 m || 
|-id=485 bgcolor=#d6d6d6
| 573485 ||  || — || February 19, 2009 || Catalina || CSS ||  || align=right | 2.6 km || 
|-id=486 bgcolor=#d6d6d6
| 573486 ||  || — || February 26, 2009 || Catalina || CSS || Tj (2.99) || align=right | 2.9 km || 
|-id=487 bgcolor=#d6d6d6
| 573487 ||  || — || March 28, 2009 || Kitt Peak || Spacewatch || THM || align=right | 1.8 km || 
|-id=488 bgcolor=#d6d6d6
| 573488 ||  || — || November 24, 2000 || Kitt Peak || Spacewatch ||  || align=right | 3.4 km || 
|-id=489 bgcolor=#d6d6d6
| 573489 ||  || — || March 17, 2009 || Kitt Peak || Spacewatch ||  || align=right | 3.2 km || 
|-id=490 bgcolor=#d6d6d6
| 573490 ||  || — || March 18, 2009 || Socorro || LINEAR ||  || align=right | 2.3 km || 
|-id=491 bgcolor=#fefefe
| 573491 ||  || — || March 3, 2005 || Catalina || CSS ||  || align=right data-sort-value="0.87" | 870 m || 
|-id=492 bgcolor=#d6d6d6
| 573492 ||  || — || May 11, 2015 || Mount Lemmon || Mount Lemmon Survey ||  || align=right | 2.2 km || 
|-id=493 bgcolor=#d6d6d6
| 573493 ||  || — || June 12, 2005 || Kitt Peak || Spacewatch ||  || align=right | 2.5 km || 
|-id=494 bgcolor=#d6d6d6
| 573494 ||  || — || December 12, 2012 || Mount Lemmon || Mount Lemmon Survey ||  || align=right | 2.5 km || 
|-id=495 bgcolor=#d6d6d6
| 573495 ||  || — || March 21, 2015 || Haleakala || Pan-STARRS ||  || align=right | 2.4 km || 
|-id=496 bgcolor=#d6d6d6
| 573496 ||  || — || March 28, 2009 || Kitt Peak || Spacewatch ||  || align=right | 2.5 km || 
|-id=497 bgcolor=#d6d6d6
| 573497 ||  || — || March 11, 2014 || Mount Lemmon || Mount Lemmon Survey ||  || align=right | 2.0 km || 
|-id=498 bgcolor=#fefefe
| 573498 ||  || — || March 28, 2009 || Kitt Peak || Spacewatch ||  || align=right data-sort-value="0.68" | 680 m || 
|-id=499 bgcolor=#d6d6d6
| 573499 ||  || — || June 11, 2015 || Haleakala || Pan-STARRS ||  || align=right | 2.0 km || 
|-id=500 bgcolor=#fefefe
| 573500 ||  || — || March 17, 2009 || Kitt Peak || Spacewatch ||  || align=right data-sort-value="0.62" | 620 m || 
|}

573501–573600 

|-bgcolor=#d6d6d6
| 573501 ||  || — || April 4, 2015 || Haleakala || Pan-STARRS ||  || align=right | 2.8 km || 
|-id=502 bgcolor=#d6d6d6
| 573502 ||  || — || March 21, 2009 || Kitt Peak || Spacewatch ||  || align=right | 2.4 km || 
|-id=503 bgcolor=#d6d6d6
| 573503 ||  || — || March 26, 2009 || Mount Lemmon || Mount Lemmon Survey ||  || align=right | 2.4 km || 
|-id=504 bgcolor=#d6d6d6
| 573504 ||  || — || February 26, 2014 || Haleakala || Pan-STARRS ||  || align=right | 2.3 km || 
|-id=505 bgcolor=#d6d6d6
| 573505 ||  || — || February 26, 2014 || Haleakala || Pan-STARRS ||  || align=right | 2.2 km || 
|-id=506 bgcolor=#d6d6d6
| 573506 ||  || — || August 10, 2016 || Haleakala || Pan-STARRS ||  || align=right | 2.2 km || 
|-id=507 bgcolor=#d6d6d6
| 573507 ||  || — || October 16, 2012 || Mount Lemmon || Mount Lemmon Survey ||  || align=right | 2.3 km || 
|-id=508 bgcolor=#d6d6d6
| 573508 ||  || — || September 4, 2011 || Kitt Peak || Spacewatch ||  || align=right | 2.0 km || 
|-id=509 bgcolor=#fefefe
| 573509 ||  || — || August 28, 2006 || Kitt Peak || Spacewatch ||  || align=right data-sort-value="0.66" | 660 m || 
|-id=510 bgcolor=#d6d6d6
| 573510 ||  || — || March 19, 2009 || Kitt Peak || Spacewatch ||  || align=right | 2.2 km || 
|-id=511 bgcolor=#d6d6d6
| 573511 ||  || — || March 19, 2009 || Kitt Peak || Spacewatch ||  || align=right | 2.7 km || 
|-id=512 bgcolor=#d6d6d6
| 573512 ||  || — || March 19, 2009 || Mount Lemmon || Mount Lemmon Survey ||  || align=right | 2.3 km || 
|-id=513 bgcolor=#d6d6d6
| 573513 ||  || — || November 23, 2008 || Mount Lemmon || Mount Lemmon Survey ||  || align=right | 3.1 km || 
|-id=514 bgcolor=#C2FFFF
| 573514 ||  || — || April 3, 2009 || Cerro Burek || Alianza S4 Obs. || L5 || align=right | 8.3 km || 
|-id=515 bgcolor=#d6d6d6
| 573515 ||  || — || February 26, 2014 || Haleakala || Pan-STARRS ||  || align=right | 2.4 km || 
|-id=516 bgcolor=#d6d6d6
| 573516 ||  || — || November 22, 2012 || Kitt Peak || Spacewatch ||  || align=right | 2.8 km || 
|-id=517 bgcolor=#fefefe
| 573517 ||  || — || April 2, 2009 || Mount Lemmon || Mount Lemmon Survey ||  || align=right data-sort-value="0.78" | 780 m || 
|-id=518 bgcolor=#fefefe
| 573518 ||  || — || March 29, 2009 || Kitt Peak || Spacewatch ||  || align=right data-sort-value="0.66" | 660 m || 
|-id=519 bgcolor=#d6d6d6
| 573519 ||  || — || March 18, 2009 || Kitt Peak || Spacewatch ||  || align=right | 2.2 km || 
|-id=520 bgcolor=#d6d6d6
| 573520 ||  || — || April 1, 2009 || Mount Lemmon || Mount Lemmon Survey ||  || align=right | 2.8 km || 
|-id=521 bgcolor=#fefefe
| 573521 ||  || — || April 1, 2009 || Mount Lemmon || Mount Lemmon Survey ||  || align=right data-sort-value="0.59" | 590 m || 
|-id=522 bgcolor=#d6d6d6
| 573522 ||  || — || April 2, 2009 || Kitt Peak || Spacewatch ||  || align=right | 2.4 km || 
|-id=523 bgcolor=#d6d6d6
| 573523 ||  || — || April 2, 2009 || Kitt Peak || Spacewatch ||  || align=right | 2.4 km || 
|-id=524 bgcolor=#d6d6d6
| 573524 ||  || — || April 2, 2009 || Kitt Peak || Spacewatch ||  || align=right | 2.4 km || 
|-id=525 bgcolor=#d6d6d6
| 573525 ||  || — || April 2, 2009 || Kitt Peak || Spacewatch ||  || align=right | 2.2 km || 
|-id=526 bgcolor=#d6d6d6
| 573526 ||  || — || April 1, 2009 || Mount Lemmon || Mount Lemmon Survey ||  || align=right | 2.2 km || 
|-id=527 bgcolor=#fefefe
| 573527 ||  || — || April 17, 2009 || Kitt Peak || Spacewatch ||  || align=right data-sort-value="0.59" | 590 m || 
|-id=528 bgcolor=#d6d6d6
| 573528 ||  || — || April 17, 2009 || Kitt Peak || Spacewatch ||  || align=right | 2.6 km || 
|-id=529 bgcolor=#d6d6d6
| 573529 ||  || — || April 17, 2009 || Kitt Peak || Spacewatch ||  || align=right | 2.7 km || 
|-id=530 bgcolor=#d6d6d6
| 573530 ||  || — || April 2, 2009 || Kitt Peak || Spacewatch ||  || align=right | 3.3 km || 
|-id=531 bgcolor=#d6d6d6
| 573531 ||  || — || April 17, 2009 || Mount Lemmon || Mount Lemmon Survey ||  || align=right | 2.2 km || 
|-id=532 bgcolor=#d6d6d6
| 573532 ||  || — || April 18, 2009 || Kitt Peak || Spacewatch ||  || align=right | 2.0 km || 
|-id=533 bgcolor=#fefefe
| 573533 ||  || — || September 13, 2007 || Mount Lemmon || Mount Lemmon Survey ||  || align=right data-sort-value="0.83" | 830 m || 
|-id=534 bgcolor=#d6d6d6
| 573534 ||  || — || April 18, 2009 || Kitt Peak || Spacewatch ||  || align=right | 2.0 km || 
|-id=535 bgcolor=#d6d6d6
| 573535 ||  || — || April 18, 2009 || Kitt Peak || Spacewatch ||  || align=right | 2.4 km || 
|-id=536 bgcolor=#d6d6d6
| 573536 ||  || — || March 16, 2009 || Kitt Peak || Spacewatch ||  || align=right | 2.0 km || 
|-id=537 bgcolor=#d6d6d6
| 573537 ||  || — || November 15, 2006 || Catalina || CSS ||  || align=right | 3.2 km || 
|-id=538 bgcolor=#d6d6d6
| 573538 ||  || — || April 2, 2009 || Mount Lemmon || Mount Lemmon Survey ||  || align=right | 2.3 km || 
|-id=539 bgcolor=#d6d6d6
| 573539 ||  || — || April 17, 2009 || Kitt Peak || Spacewatch ||  || align=right | 2.3 km || 
|-id=540 bgcolor=#d6d6d6
| 573540 ||  || — || July 31, 2005 || Palomar || NEAT ||  || align=right | 3.2 km || 
|-id=541 bgcolor=#E9E9E9
| 573541 ||  || — || April 17, 2009 || Kitt Peak || Spacewatch ||  || align=right data-sort-value="0.98" | 980 m || 
|-id=542 bgcolor=#fefefe
| 573542 ||  || — || April 17, 2009 || Kitt Peak || Spacewatch || H || align=right data-sort-value="0.49" | 490 m || 
|-id=543 bgcolor=#d6d6d6
| 573543 ||  || — || April 18, 2009 || Kitt Peak || Spacewatch ||  || align=right | 2.6 km || 
|-id=544 bgcolor=#d6d6d6
| 573544 ||  || — || October 16, 2006 || Kitt Peak || Spacewatch ||  || align=right | 2.5 km || 
|-id=545 bgcolor=#d6d6d6
| 573545 ||  || — || February 2, 2008 || Mount Lemmon || Mount Lemmon Survey ||  || align=right | 2.0 km || 
|-id=546 bgcolor=#d6d6d6
| 573546 ||  || — || April 19, 2009 || Kitt Peak || Spacewatch ||  || align=right | 2.2 km || 
|-id=547 bgcolor=#d6d6d6
| 573547 ||  || — || April 19, 2009 || Mount Lemmon || Mount Lemmon Survey ||  || align=right | 3.2 km || 
|-id=548 bgcolor=#d6d6d6
| 573548 ||  || — || February 10, 2008 || Mount Lemmon || Mount Lemmon Survey ||  || align=right | 2.7 km || 
|-id=549 bgcolor=#fefefe
| 573549 ||  || — || March 24, 2009 || Mount Lemmon || Mount Lemmon Survey ||  || align=right data-sort-value="0.57" | 570 m || 
|-id=550 bgcolor=#d6d6d6
| 573550 ||  || — || August 28, 2005 || Siding Spring || SSS ||  || align=right | 3.7 km || 
|-id=551 bgcolor=#d6d6d6
| 573551 ||  || — || February 20, 2009 || Kitt Peak || Spacewatch ||  || align=right | 2.1 km || 
|-id=552 bgcolor=#d6d6d6
| 573552 ||  || — || April 20, 2009 || Kitt Peak || Spacewatch ||  || align=right | 2.2 km || 
|-id=553 bgcolor=#d6d6d6
| 573553 ||  || — || April 20, 2009 || Kitt Peak || Spacewatch ||  || align=right | 3.0 km || 
|-id=554 bgcolor=#fefefe
| 573554 ||  || — || April 18, 2009 || Kitt Peak || Spacewatch ||  || align=right data-sort-value="0.61" | 610 m || 
|-id=555 bgcolor=#d6d6d6
| 573555 ||  || — || April 19, 2009 || Kitt Peak || Spacewatch ||  || align=right | 3.5 km || 
|-id=556 bgcolor=#d6d6d6
| 573556 ||  || — || April 19, 2009 || Kitt Peak || Spacewatch ||  || align=right | 2.8 km || 
|-id=557 bgcolor=#d6d6d6
| 573557 ||  || — || October 21, 2006 || Mount Lemmon || Mount Lemmon Survey ||  || align=right | 2.4 km || 
|-id=558 bgcolor=#d6d6d6
| 573558 ||  || — || April 21, 2009 || Mount Lemmon || Mount Lemmon Survey ||  || align=right | 3.6 km || 
|-id=559 bgcolor=#d6d6d6
| 573559 ||  || — || May 19, 2004 || Kitt Peak || Spacewatch ||  || align=right | 3.1 km || 
|-id=560 bgcolor=#fefefe
| 573560 ||  || — || April 21, 2009 || Kitt Peak || Spacewatch ||  || align=right data-sort-value="0.71" | 710 m || 
|-id=561 bgcolor=#fefefe
| 573561 ||  || — || February 9, 2005 || Mount Lemmon || Mount Lemmon Survey ||  || align=right data-sort-value="0.63" | 630 m || 
|-id=562 bgcolor=#d6d6d6
| 573562 ||  || — || April 20, 2009 || Kitt Peak || Spacewatch ||  || align=right | 2.1 km || 
|-id=563 bgcolor=#fefefe
| 573563 ||  || — || April 21, 2009 || Mount Lemmon || Mount Lemmon Survey ||  || align=right data-sort-value="0.62" | 620 m || 
|-id=564 bgcolor=#d6d6d6
| 573564 ||  || — || October 18, 2001 || Kitt Peak || Spacewatch ||  || align=right | 2.6 km || 
|-id=565 bgcolor=#fefefe
| 573565 ||  || — || March 21, 2009 || Kitt Peak || Spacewatch ||  || align=right data-sort-value="0.66" | 660 m || 
|-id=566 bgcolor=#d6d6d6
| 573566 ||  || — || April 22, 2009 || Mount Lemmon || Mount Lemmon Survey ||  || align=right | 2.2 km || 
|-id=567 bgcolor=#d6d6d6
| 573567 ||  || — || March 31, 2009 || Kitt Peak || Spacewatch ||  || align=right | 2.3 km || 
|-id=568 bgcolor=#d6d6d6
| 573568 ||  || — || April 22, 2009 || Mount Lemmon || Mount Lemmon Survey || BRA || align=right | 1.2 km || 
|-id=569 bgcolor=#d6d6d6
| 573569 ||  || — || April 28, 2009 || Catalina || CSS ||  || align=right | 2.5 km || 
|-id=570 bgcolor=#d6d6d6
| 573570 ||  || — || April 26, 2009 || Cerro Burek || Alianza S4 Obs. ||  || align=right | 2.5 km || 
|-id=571 bgcolor=#fefefe
| 573571 ||  || — || April 2, 2009 || Kitt Peak || Spacewatch ||  || align=right data-sort-value="0.59" | 590 m || 
|-id=572 bgcolor=#fefefe
| 573572 ||  || — || August 28, 2006 || Catalina || CSS ||  || align=right data-sort-value="0.96" | 960 m || 
|-id=573 bgcolor=#d6d6d6
| 573573 ||  || — || March 29, 2009 || Kitt Peak || Spacewatch ||  || align=right | 2.9 km || 
|-id=574 bgcolor=#d6d6d6
| 573574 ||  || — || March 24, 2009 || Mount Lemmon || Mount Lemmon Survey ||  || align=right | 2.5 km || 
|-id=575 bgcolor=#d6d6d6
| 573575 ||  || — || April 30, 2009 || Kitt Peak || Spacewatch || Tj (2.96) || align=right | 5.4 km || 
|-id=576 bgcolor=#fefefe
| 573576 ||  || — || April 20, 2009 || Mount Lemmon || Mount Lemmon Survey || H || align=right data-sort-value="0.68" | 680 m || 
|-id=577 bgcolor=#E9E9E9
| 573577 ||  || — || April 29, 2009 || Cerro Burek || Alianza S4 Obs. ||  || align=right | 2.5 km || 
|-id=578 bgcolor=#d6d6d6
| 573578 ||  || — || April 29, 2009 || Cerro Burek || Alianza S4 Obs. ||  || align=right | 2.9 km || 
|-id=579 bgcolor=#d6d6d6
| 573579 ||  || — || April 22, 2009 || Kitt Peak || Spacewatch ||  || align=right | 2.6 km || 
|-id=580 bgcolor=#d6d6d6
| 573580 ||  || — || April 20, 2009 || Mount Lemmon || Mount Lemmon Survey ||  || align=right | 2.1 km || 
|-id=581 bgcolor=#d6d6d6
| 573581 ||  || — || April 22, 2009 || Mount Lemmon || Mount Lemmon Survey ||  || align=right | 2.1 km || 
|-id=582 bgcolor=#d6d6d6
| 573582 ||  || — || April 1, 2003 || Apache Point || SDSS Collaboration ||  || align=right | 2.7 km || 
|-id=583 bgcolor=#d6d6d6
| 573583 ||  || — || February 11, 2014 || Mount Lemmon || Mount Lemmon Survey ||  || align=right | 2.5 km || 
|-id=584 bgcolor=#d6d6d6
| 573584 ||  || — || May 22, 2015 || Haleakala || Pan-STARRS ||  || align=right | 2.1 km || 
|-id=585 bgcolor=#d6d6d6
| 573585 ||  || — || November 11, 2007 || Mount Lemmon || Mount Lemmon Survey ||  || align=right | 3.4 km || 
|-id=586 bgcolor=#d6d6d6
| 573586 ||  || — || November 7, 2012 || Mount Lemmon || Mount Lemmon Survey ||  || align=right | 2.7 km || 
|-id=587 bgcolor=#d6d6d6
| 573587 ||  || — || April 10, 2014 || Haleakala || Pan-STARRS ||  || align=right | 2.9 km || 
|-id=588 bgcolor=#d6d6d6
| 573588 ||  || — || September 6, 2016 || Haleakala || Pan-STARRS ||  || align=right | 2.6 km || 
|-id=589 bgcolor=#fefefe
| 573589 ||  || — || October 5, 2013 || Haleakala || Pan-STARRS ||  || align=right data-sort-value="0.47" | 470 m || 
|-id=590 bgcolor=#d6d6d6
| 573590 ||  || — || July 30, 2016 || Haleakala || Pan-STARRS ||  || align=right | 2.7 km || 
|-id=591 bgcolor=#d6d6d6
| 573591 ||  || — || May 5, 2003 || Kitt Peak || Spacewatch ||  || align=right | 3.0 km || 
|-id=592 bgcolor=#d6d6d6
| 573592 ||  || — || June 18, 2015 || Haleakala || Pan-STARRS ||  || align=right | 2.9 km || 
|-id=593 bgcolor=#d6d6d6
| 573593 ||  || — || April 18, 2009 || Mount Lemmon || Mount Lemmon Survey ||  || align=right | 2.7 km || 
|-id=594 bgcolor=#d6d6d6
| 573594 ||  || — || March 4, 2014 || ESA OGS || ESA OGS ||  || align=right | 2.3 km || 
|-id=595 bgcolor=#d6d6d6
| 573595 ||  || — || April 5, 2014 || Haleakala || Pan-STARRS ||  || align=right | 2.2 km || 
|-id=596 bgcolor=#fefefe
| 573596 ||  || — || May 8, 2013 || Haleakala || Pan-STARRS ||  || align=right data-sort-value="0.98" | 980 m || 
|-id=597 bgcolor=#fefefe
| 573597 ||  || — || January 18, 2016 || Haleakala || Pan-STARRS ||  || align=right data-sort-value="0.74" | 740 m || 
|-id=598 bgcolor=#fefefe
| 573598 ||  || — || April 22, 2009 || Mount Lemmon || Mount Lemmon Survey ||  || align=right data-sort-value="0.50" | 500 m || 
|-id=599 bgcolor=#d6d6d6
| 573599 ||  || — || April 30, 2009 || Kitt Peak || Spacewatch ||  || align=right | 2.1 km || 
|-id=600 bgcolor=#fefefe
| 573600 ||  || — || April 21, 2009 || Kitt Peak || Spacewatch ||  || align=right data-sort-value="0.74" | 740 m || 
|}

573601–573700 

|-bgcolor=#fefefe
| 573601 ||  || — || April 21, 2009 || Mount Lemmon || Mount Lemmon Survey ||  || align=right data-sort-value="0.68" | 680 m || 
|-id=602 bgcolor=#d6d6d6
| 573602 ||  || — || April 24, 2009 || Mount Lemmon || Mount Lemmon Survey ||  || align=right | 2.5 km || 
|-id=603 bgcolor=#d6d6d6
| 573603 ||  || — || April 17, 2009 || Kitt Peak || Spacewatch ||  || align=right | 2.5 km || 
|-id=604 bgcolor=#C2FFFF
| 573604 ||  || — || April 30, 2009 || Mount Lemmon || Mount Lemmon Survey || L5 || align=right | 8.7 km || 
|-id=605 bgcolor=#d6d6d6
| 573605 ||  || — || April 27, 2009 || Mount Lemmon || Mount Lemmon Survey ||  || align=right | 2.3 km || 
|-id=606 bgcolor=#d6d6d6
| 573606 ||  || — || April 20, 2009 || Mount Lemmon || Mount Lemmon Survey ||  || align=right | 2.3 km || 
|-id=607 bgcolor=#d6d6d6
| 573607 ||  || — || April 30, 2009 || Kitt Peak || Spacewatch ||  || align=right | 2.2 km || 
|-id=608 bgcolor=#d6d6d6
| 573608 ||  || — || April 18, 2009 || Mount Lemmon || Mount Lemmon Survey ||  || align=right | 2.8 km || 
|-id=609 bgcolor=#d6d6d6
| 573609 ||  || — || April 28, 2009 || Kitt Peak || Spacewatch ||  || align=right | 2.7 km || 
|-id=610 bgcolor=#d6d6d6
| 573610 ||  || — || April 21, 2009 || Mount Lemmon || Mount Lemmon Survey ||  || align=right | 2.2 km || 
|-id=611 bgcolor=#d6d6d6
| 573611 ||  || — || April 22, 2009 || Mount Lemmon || Mount Lemmon Survey ||  || align=right | 2.2 km || 
|-id=612 bgcolor=#C2FFFF
| 573612 ||  || — || April 19, 2009 || Kitt Peak || Spacewatch || L5 || align=right | 7.7 km || 
|-id=613 bgcolor=#fefefe
| 573613 ||  || — || March 10, 2005 || Mount Lemmon || Mount Lemmon Survey ||  || align=right data-sort-value="0.56" | 560 m || 
|-id=614 bgcolor=#d6d6d6
| 573614 ||  || — || May 4, 2009 || Mount Lemmon || Mount Lemmon Survey ||  || align=right | 2.9 km || 
|-id=615 bgcolor=#fefefe
| 573615 ||  || — || November 19, 2007 || Kitt Peak || Spacewatch ||  || align=right data-sort-value="0.90" | 900 m || 
|-id=616 bgcolor=#d6d6d6
| 573616 ||  || — || March 8, 2003 || Anderson Mesa || LONEOS ||  || align=right | 2.9 km || 
|-id=617 bgcolor=#d6d6d6
| 573617 ||  || — || May 14, 2009 || Mount Lemmon || Mount Lemmon Survey ||  || align=right | 2.7 km || 
|-id=618 bgcolor=#d6d6d6
| 573618 ||  || — || December 21, 2012 || Mount Lemmon || Mount Lemmon Survey ||  || align=right | 2.7 km || 
|-id=619 bgcolor=#d6d6d6
| 573619 ||  || — || February 28, 2014 || Oukaimeden || C. Rinner ||  || align=right | 2.6 km || 
|-id=620 bgcolor=#d6d6d6
| 573620 ||  || — || December 11, 2012 || Mount Lemmon || Mount Lemmon Survey ||  || align=right | 2.6 km || 
|-id=621 bgcolor=#d6d6d6
| 573621 ||  || — || December 12, 2012 || Kitt Peak || Spacewatch ||  || align=right | 2.2 km || 
|-id=622 bgcolor=#d6d6d6
| 573622 ||  || — || May 1, 2009 || Kitt Peak || Spacewatch ||  || align=right | 2.5 km || 
|-id=623 bgcolor=#d6d6d6
| 573623 ||  || — || May 4, 2009 || Mount Lemmon || Mount Lemmon Survey ||  || align=right | 2.9 km || 
|-id=624 bgcolor=#d6d6d6
| 573624 ||  || — || May 1, 2009 || Mount Lemmon || Mount Lemmon Survey ||  || align=right | 2.4 km || 
|-id=625 bgcolor=#d6d6d6
| 573625 ||  || — || May 15, 2009 || Kitt Peak || Spacewatch ||  || align=right | 2.3 km || 
|-id=626 bgcolor=#d6d6d6
| 573626 ||  || — || May 2, 2009 || Mount Lemmon || Mount Lemmon Survey ||  || align=right | 2.4 km || 
|-id=627 bgcolor=#d6d6d6
| 573627 ||  || — || April 24, 2009 || Kitt Peak || Spacewatch ||  || align=right | 2.0 km || 
|-id=628 bgcolor=#fefefe
| 573628 ||  || — || May 25, 2009 || Kitt Peak || Spacewatch ||  || align=right data-sort-value="0.65" | 650 m || 
|-id=629 bgcolor=#d6d6d6
| 573629 ||  || — || May 25, 2009 || Kitt Peak || Spacewatch ||  || align=right | 2.4 km || 
|-id=630 bgcolor=#fefefe
| 573630 ||  || — || May 25, 2009 || Kitt Peak || Spacewatch ||  || align=right data-sort-value="0.71" | 710 m || 
|-id=631 bgcolor=#d6d6d6
| 573631 ||  || — || August 8, 2004 || Palomar || NEAT ||  || align=right | 3.2 km || 
|-id=632 bgcolor=#d6d6d6
| 573632 ||  || — || October 1, 2005 || Mount Lemmon || Mount Lemmon Survey ||  || align=right | 2.4 km || 
|-id=633 bgcolor=#fefefe
| 573633 ||  || — || May 29, 2009 || Mount Lemmon || Mount Lemmon Survey ||  || align=right data-sort-value="0.92" | 920 m || 
|-id=634 bgcolor=#fefefe
| 573634 ||  || — || May 18, 2009 || Mount Lemmon || Mount Lemmon Survey ||  || align=right data-sort-value="0.78" | 780 m || 
|-id=635 bgcolor=#d6d6d6
| 573635 ||  || — || May 30, 2009 || Mount Lemmon || Mount Lemmon Survey ||  || align=right | 2.4 km || 
|-id=636 bgcolor=#d6d6d6
| 573636 ||  || — || February 3, 2003 || Palomar || NEAT ||  || align=right | 3.7 km || 
|-id=637 bgcolor=#fefefe
| 573637 ||  || — || May 30, 2009 || Mount Lemmon || Mount Lemmon Survey || H || align=right data-sort-value="0.61" | 610 m || 
|-id=638 bgcolor=#fefefe
| 573638 ||  || — || March 31, 2009 || Mount Lemmon || Mount Lemmon Survey ||  || align=right data-sort-value="0.71" | 710 m || 
|-id=639 bgcolor=#d6d6d6
| 573639 ||  || — || May 16, 2009 || Kitt Peak || Spacewatch ||  || align=right | 2.5 km || 
|-id=640 bgcolor=#d6d6d6
| 573640 ||  || — || March 8, 2014 || Mount Lemmon || Mount Lemmon Survey ||  || align=right | 2.2 km || 
|-id=641 bgcolor=#d6d6d6
| 573641 ||  || — || April 5, 2014 || Haleakala || Pan-STARRS ||  || align=right | 2.5 km || 
|-id=642 bgcolor=#d6d6d6
| 573642 ||  || — || May 18, 2009 || Mount Lemmon || Mount Lemmon Survey ||  || align=right | 1.9 km || 
|-id=643 bgcolor=#C2FFFF
| 573643 ||  || — || May 24, 2009 || Mount Lemmon || Mount Lemmon Survey || L5 || align=right | 7.4 km || 
|-id=644 bgcolor=#C2FFFF
| 573644 ||  || — || May 17, 2009 || Mount Lemmon || Mount Lemmon Survey || L5 || align=right | 7.3 km || 
|-id=645 bgcolor=#d6d6d6
| 573645 ||  || — || April 24, 2009 || Kitt Peak || Spacewatch ||  || align=right | 3.2 km || 
|-id=646 bgcolor=#d6d6d6
| 573646 ||  || — || May 1, 2009 || Mount Lemmon || Mount Lemmon Survey ||  || align=right | 3.0 km || 
|-id=647 bgcolor=#d6d6d6
| 573647 ||  || — || June 14, 2009 || Kitt Peak || Spacewatch ||  || align=right | 2.6 km || 
|-id=648 bgcolor=#d6d6d6
| 573648 ||  || — || February 9, 2008 || Kitt Peak || Spacewatch ||  || align=right | 2.6 km || 
|-id=649 bgcolor=#d6d6d6
| 573649 ||  || — || June 21, 2009 || Mount Lemmon || Mount Lemmon Survey ||  || align=right | 2.8 km || 
|-id=650 bgcolor=#d6d6d6
| 573650 ||  || — || January 17, 2007 || Kitt Peak || Spacewatch ||  || align=right | 2.7 km || 
|-id=651 bgcolor=#d6d6d6
| 573651 ||  || — || February 9, 2008 || Kitt Peak || Spacewatch ||  || align=right | 2.6 km || 
|-id=652 bgcolor=#d6d6d6
| 573652 ||  || — || December 13, 2012 || Nogales || M. Schwartz, P. R. Holvorcem ||  || align=right | 2.9 km || 
|-id=653 bgcolor=#E9E9E9
| 573653 ||  || — || January 16, 2011 || Mount Lemmon || Mount Lemmon Survey ||  || align=right | 1.4 km || 
|-id=654 bgcolor=#d6d6d6
| 573654 ||  || — || February 15, 2013 || Haleakala || Pan-STARRS ||  || align=right | 2.9 km || 
|-id=655 bgcolor=#fefefe
| 573655 ||  || — || January 12, 2016 || Haleakala || Pan-STARRS ||  || align=right data-sort-value="0.86" | 860 m || 
|-id=656 bgcolor=#d6d6d6
| 573656 ||  || — || November 25, 2011 || Haleakala || Pan-STARRS ||  || align=right | 3.5 km || 
|-id=657 bgcolor=#d6d6d6
| 573657 ||  || — || November 5, 2010 || Mount Lemmon || Mount Lemmon Survey ||  || align=right | 2.6 km || 
|-id=658 bgcolor=#d6d6d6
| 573658 ||  || — || October 26, 2011 || Haleakala || Pan-STARRS ||  || align=right | 2.7 km || 
|-id=659 bgcolor=#d6d6d6
| 573659 ||  || — || June 16, 2009 || Mount Lemmon || Mount Lemmon Survey ||  || align=right | 3.0 km || 
|-id=660 bgcolor=#E9E9E9
| 573660 ||  || — || August 27, 2005 || Palomar || NEAT || EUN || align=right | 1.3 km || 
|-id=661 bgcolor=#d6d6d6
| 573661 ||  || — || July 25, 2009 || Marly || P. Kocher ||  || align=right | 4.5 km || 
|-id=662 bgcolor=#E9E9E9
| 573662 ||  || — || July 27, 2009 || Kitt Peak || Spacewatch ||  || align=right data-sort-value="0.94" | 940 m || 
|-id=663 bgcolor=#E9E9E9
| 573663 ||  || — || July 27, 2009 || Kitt Peak || Spacewatch ||  || align=right | 1.2 km || 
|-id=664 bgcolor=#E9E9E9
| 573664 ||  || — || July 28, 2009 || Kitt Peak || Spacewatch ||  || align=right | 1.5 km || 
|-id=665 bgcolor=#d6d6d6
| 573665 ||  || — || August 25, 2004 || Kitt Peak || Spacewatch ||  || align=right | 2.0 km || 
|-id=666 bgcolor=#d6d6d6
| 573666 ||  || — || July 28, 2009 || Kitt Peak || Spacewatch ||  || align=right | 3.2 km || 
|-id=667 bgcolor=#E9E9E9
| 573667 ||  || — || September 19, 2001 || Apache Point || SDSS Collaboration ||  || align=right data-sort-value="0.96" | 960 m || 
|-id=668 bgcolor=#d6d6d6
| 573668 ||  || — || July 29, 2009 || Kitt Peak || Spacewatch ||  || align=right | 2.3 km || 
|-id=669 bgcolor=#fefefe
| 573669 ||  || — || January 30, 2011 || Haleakala || Pan-STARRS ||  || align=right data-sort-value="0.82" | 820 m || 
|-id=670 bgcolor=#E9E9E9
| 573670 ||  || — || November 7, 2013 || Mount Lemmon || Mount Lemmon Survey ||  || align=right | 1.0 km || 
|-id=671 bgcolor=#d6d6d6
| 573671 ||  || — || July 23, 2015 || Haleakala || Pan-STARRS ||  || align=right | 3.4 km || 
|-id=672 bgcolor=#fefefe
| 573672 ||  || — || April 27, 2012 || Haleakala || Pan-STARRS ||  || align=right data-sort-value="0.59" | 590 m || 
|-id=673 bgcolor=#E9E9E9
| 573673 ||  || — || July 29, 2009 || Kitt Peak || Spacewatch ||  || align=right | 1.0 km || 
|-id=674 bgcolor=#E9E9E9
| 573674 ||  || — || May 2, 2008 || Bergisch Gladbach || W. Bickel || MAR || align=right data-sort-value="0.83" | 830 m || 
|-id=675 bgcolor=#d6d6d6
| 573675 ||  || — || August 15, 2009 || Kitt Peak || Spacewatch ||  || align=right | 2.6 km || 
|-id=676 bgcolor=#d6d6d6
| 573676 ||  || — || August 15, 2009 || Kitt Peak || Spacewatch ||  || align=right | 2.5 km || 
|-id=677 bgcolor=#E9E9E9
| 573677 ||  || — || July 30, 2005 || Palomar || NEAT ||  || align=right | 1.4 km || 
|-id=678 bgcolor=#fefefe
| 573678 ||  || — || February 19, 2001 || Kitt Peak || Spacewatch ||  || align=right data-sort-value="0.90" | 900 m || 
|-id=679 bgcolor=#E9E9E9
| 573679 ||  || — || August 19, 2009 || Kitt Peak || Spacewatch ||  || align=right | 1.1 km || 
|-id=680 bgcolor=#d6d6d6
| 573680 ||  || — || August 27, 2009 || Kitt Peak || Spacewatch ||  || align=right | 2.5 km || 
|-id=681 bgcolor=#E9E9E9
| 573681 ||  || — || August 27, 2009 || Kitt Peak || Spacewatch ||  || align=right | 1.4 km || 
|-id=682 bgcolor=#d6d6d6
| 573682 ||  || — || August 27, 2009 || Kitt Peak || Spacewatch ||  || align=right | 2.6 km || 
|-id=683 bgcolor=#E9E9E9
| 573683 ||  || — || August 26, 2005 || Campo Imperatore || A. Boattini ||  || align=right data-sort-value="0.73" | 730 m || 
|-id=684 bgcolor=#d6d6d6
| 573684 ||  || — || August 18, 2009 || Kitt Peak || Spacewatch || 3:2 || align=right | 3.7 km || 
|-id=685 bgcolor=#E9E9E9
| 573685 ||  || — || December 10, 2014 || Mount Lemmon || Mount Lemmon Survey ||  || align=right data-sort-value="0.97" | 970 m || 
|-id=686 bgcolor=#fefefe
| 573686 ||  || — || August 16, 2009 || Kitt Peak || Spacewatch ||  || align=right data-sort-value="0.65" | 650 m || 
|-id=687 bgcolor=#d6d6d6
| 573687 ||  || — || January 19, 2012 || Haleakala || Pan-STARRS ||  || align=right | 3.0 km || 
|-id=688 bgcolor=#d6d6d6
| 573688 ||  || — || August 17, 2009 || Kitt Peak || Spacewatch ||  || align=right | 2.0 km || 
|-id=689 bgcolor=#E9E9E9
| 573689 ||  || — || September 12, 2009 || Piszkesteto || K. Sárneczky ||  || align=right | 2.6 km || 
|-id=690 bgcolor=#d6d6d6
| 573690 ||  || — || September 12, 2009 || Kitt Peak || Spacewatch ||  || align=right | 2.4 km || 
|-id=691 bgcolor=#E9E9E9
| 573691 ||  || — || September 12, 2009 || Kitt Peak || Spacewatch ||  || align=right | 1.8 km || 
|-id=692 bgcolor=#C2FFFF
| 573692 ||  || — || September 12, 2009 || Kitt Peak || Spacewatch || L4 || align=right | 8.7 km || 
|-id=693 bgcolor=#d6d6d6
| 573693 ||  || — || September 14, 2009 || Kachina || J. Hobart ||  || align=right | 2.8 km || 
|-id=694 bgcolor=#E9E9E9
| 573694 ||  || — || September 14, 2009 || Catalina || CSS ||  || align=right | 1.1 km || 
|-id=695 bgcolor=#E9E9E9
| 573695 ||  || — || October 24, 2005 || Kitt Peak || Spacewatch ||  || align=right | 1.1 km || 
|-id=696 bgcolor=#E9E9E9
| 573696 ||  || — || September 14, 2009 || Kitt Peak || Spacewatch ||  || align=right | 1.3 km || 
|-id=697 bgcolor=#E9E9E9
| 573697 ||  || — || September 14, 2009 || Kitt Peak || Spacewatch ||  || align=right data-sort-value="0.83" | 830 m || 
|-id=698 bgcolor=#E9E9E9
| 573698 ||  || — || August 28, 2000 || Cerro Tololo || R. Millis, L. H. Wasserman ||  || align=right | 1.4 km || 
|-id=699 bgcolor=#d6d6d6
| 573699 ||  || — || April 11, 2008 || Kitt Peak || Spacewatch ||  || align=right | 2.1 km || 
|-id=700 bgcolor=#E9E9E9
| 573700 ||  || — || September 15, 2009 || Kitt Peak || Spacewatch ||  || align=right | 1.6 km || 
|}

573701–573800 

|-bgcolor=#E9E9E9
| 573701 ||  || — || April 25, 2004 || Kitt Peak || Spacewatch ||  || align=right | 1.1 km || 
|-id=702 bgcolor=#d6d6d6
| 573702 ||  || — || September 15, 2009 || Kitt Peak || Spacewatch ||  || align=right | 1.6 km || 
|-id=703 bgcolor=#C2FFFF
| 573703 ||  || — || April 1, 2003 || Kitt Peak || M. W. Buie, A. B. Jordan || L4 || align=right | 8.9 km || 
|-id=704 bgcolor=#C2FFFF
| 573704 ||  || — || September 15, 2009 || Kitt Peak || Spacewatch || L4 || align=right | 9.1 km || 
|-id=705 bgcolor=#E9E9E9
| 573705 ||  || — || September 15, 2009 || Kitt Peak || Spacewatch ||  || align=right | 1.4 km || 
|-id=706 bgcolor=#d6d6d6
| 573706 ||  || — || October 27, 2003 || Kitt Peak || Spacewatch || 7:4 || align=right | 4.4 km || 
|-id=707 bgcolor=#E9E9E9
| 573707 ||  || — || September 15, 2009 || Kitt Peak || Spacewatch ||  || align=right | 1.8 km || 
|-id=708 bgcolor=#E9E9E9
| 573708 ||  || — || September 15, 2009 || Kitt Peak || Spacewatch ||  || align=right | 1.2 km || 
|-id=709 bgcolor=#d6d6d6
| 573709 ||  || — || September 16, 2009 || Kitt Peak || Spacewatch ||  || align=right | 2.1 km || 
|-id=710 bgcolor=#fefefe
| 573710 ||  || — || September 16, 2009 || Kitt Peak || Spacewatch ||  || align=right data-sort-value="0.79" | 790 m || 
|-id=711 bgcolor=#E9E9E9
| 573711 ||  || — || August 18, 2009 || Kitt Peak || Spacewatch ||  || align=right | 2.2 km || 
|-id=712 bgcolor=#E9E9E9
| 573712 ||  || — || October 1, 2005 || Kitt Peak || Spacewatch ||  || align=right data-sort-value="0.82" | 820 m || 
|-id=713 bgcolor=#E9E9E9
| 573713 ||  || — || August 28, 2009 || Kitt Peak || Spacewatch ||  || align=right | 1.8 km || 
|-id=714 bgcolor=#d6d6d6
| 573714 ||  || — || August 15, 2009 || Kitt Peak || Spacewatch ||  || align=right | 2.9 km || 
|-id=715 bgcolor=#E9E9E9
| 573715 ||  || — || August 17, 2009 || Kitt Peak || Spacewatch ||  || align=right data-sort-value="0.60" | 600 m || 
|-id=716 bgcolor=#C2FFFF
| 573716 ||  || — || April 26, 2003 || Kitt Peak || Spacewatch || L4 || align=right | 9.9 km || 
|-id=717 bgcolor=#fefefe
| 573717 ||  || — || September 16, 2009 || Kitt Peak || Spacewatch ||  || align=right data-sort-value="0.63" | 630 m || 
|-id=718 bgcolor=#fefefe
| 573718 ||  || — || September 16, 2009 || Kitt Peak || Spacewatch ||  || align=right data-sort-value="0.67" | 670 m || 
|-id=719 bgcolor=#d6d6d6
| 573719 ||  || — || August 15, 2009 || Kitt Peak || Spacewatch ||  || align=right | 2.8 km || 
|-id=720 bgcolor=#d6d6d6
| 573720 ||  || — || September 16, 2009 || Kitt Peak || Spacewatch ||  || align=right | 2.3 km || 
|-id=721 bgcolor=#E9E9E9
| 573721 ||  || — || March 26, 2007 || Mount Lemmon || Mount Lemmon Survey ||  || align=right | 1.8 km || 
|-id=722 bgcolor=#E9E9E9
| 573722 ||  || — || September 17, 2009 || Kitt Peak || Spacewatch ||  || align=right | 1.2 km || 
|-id=723 bgcolor=#E9E9E9
| 573723 ||  || — || October 7, 2005 || Kitt Peak || Spacewatch ||  || align=right data-sort-value="0.65" | 650 m || 
|-id=724 bgcolor=#d6d6d6
| 573724 ||  || — || September 17, 2009 || Mount Lemmon || Mount Lemmon Survey ||  || align=right | 2.4 km || 
|-id=725 bgcolor=#E9E9E9
| 573725 ||  || — || July 29, 2009 || Kitt Peak || Spacewatch ||  || align=right data-sort-value="0.82" | 820 m || 
|-id=726 bgcolor=#E9E9E9
| 573726 ||  || — || August 28, 2000 || Cerro Tololo || R. Millis, L. H. Wasserman ||  || align=right | 1.6 km || 
|-id=727 bgcolor=#E9E9E9
| 573727 ||  || — || February 23, 2007 || Mount Lemmon || Mount Lemmon Survey ||  || align=right | 1.2 km || 
|-id=728 bgcolor=#E9E9E9
| 573728 ||  || — || September 18, 2009 || Mount Lemmon || Mount Lemmon Survey ||  || align=right data-sort-value="0.85" | 850 m || 
|-id=729 bgcolor=#E9E9E9
| 573729 ||  || — || September 14, 2005 || Kitt Peak || Spacewatch ||  || align=right | 1.4 km || 
|-id=730 bgcolor=#d6d6d6
| 573730 ||  || — || November 14, 2003 || Palomar || NEAT || 7:4 || align=right | 5.0 km || 
|-id=731 bgcolor=#E9E9E9
| 573731 ||  || — || September 23, 2009 || Zelenchukskaya Stn || T. V. Kryachko, B. Satovski ||  || align=right data-sort-value="0.85" | 850 m || 
|-id=732 bgcolor=#E9E9E9
| 573732 ||  || — || September 16, 2009 || Mount Lemmon || Mount Lemmon Survey ||  || align=right | 1.2 km || 
|-id=733 bgcolor=#d6d6d6
| 573733 ||  || — || November 19, 2003 || Kitt Peak || Spacewatch || 7:4 || align=right | 3.7 km || 
|-id=734 bgcolor=#d6d6d6
| 573734 ||  || — || September 18, 2009 || Kitt Peak || Spacewatch || 7:4 || align=right | 2.9 km || 
|-id=735 bgcolor=#d6d6d6
| 573735 ||  || — || September 20, 2003 || Kitt Peak || Spacewatch ||  || align=right | 2.9 km || 
|-id=736 bgcolor=#E9E9E9
| 573736 ||  || — || August 15, 2009 || Kitt Peak || Spacewatch ||  || align=right | 1.1 km || 
|-id=737 bgcolor=#fefefe
| 573737 ||  || — || October 21, 2006 || Kitt Peak || Spacewatch ||  || align=right data-sort-value="0.48" | 480 m || 
|-id=738 bgcolor=#d6d6d6
| 573738 ||  || — || September 20, 2009 || Kitt Peak || Spacewatch ||  || align=right | 2.2 km || 
|-id=739 bgcolor=#fefefe
| 573739 ||  || — || July 27, 2009 || Kitt Peak || Spacewatch ||  || align=right data-sort-value="0.71" | 710 m || 
|-id=740 bgcolor=#E9E9E9
| 573740 ||  || — || September 25, 2005 || Kitt Peak || Spacewatch ||  || align=right data-sort-value="0.67" | 670 m || 
|-id=741 bgcolor=#E9E9E9
| 573741 ||  || — || July 18, 2004 || Socorro || LINEAR ||  || align=right | 2.1 km || 
|-id=742 bgcolor=#E9E9E9
| 573742 ||  || — || September 20, 2009 || Kitt Peak || Spacewatch ||  || align=right | 1.4 km || 
|-id=743 bgcolor=#E9E9E9
| 573743 ||  || — || October 25, 2005 || Kitt Peak || Spacewatch ||  || align=right data-sort-value="0.95" | 950 m || 
|-id=744 bgcolor=#E9E9E9
| 573744 ||  || — || September 22, 2009 || Kitt Peak || Spacewatch ||  || align=right | 1.3 km || 
|-id=745 bgcolor=#E9E9E9
| 573745 ||  || — || September 29, 2005 || Kitt Peak || Spacewatch ||  || align=right | 1.0 km || 
|-id=746 bgcolor=#E9E9E9
| 573746 ||  || — || September 22, 2009 || Kitt Peak || Spacewatch ||  || align=right | 1.2 km || 
|-id=747 bgcolor=#E9E9E9
| 573747 ||  || — || October 4, 2005 || Mount Lemmon || Mount Lemmon Survey ||  || align=right | 1.1 km || 
|-id=748 bgcolor=#E9E9E9
| 573748 ||  || — || September 2, 2005 || Palomar || NEAT ||  || align=right | 1.1 km || 
|-id=749 bgcolor=#d6d6d6
| 573749 ||  || — || September 23, 2009 || Kitt Peak || Spacewatch ||  || align=right | 3.7 km || 
|-id=750 bgcolor=#fefefe
| 573750 ||  || — || September 23, 2009 || Kitt Peak || Spacewatch ||  || align=right data-sort-value="0.86" | 860 m || 
|-id=751 bgcolor=#E9E9E9
| 573751 ||  || — || January 24, 2007 || Mount Lemmon || Mount Lemmon Survey ||  || align=right data-sort-value="0.79" | 790 m || 
|-id=752 bgcolor=#E9E9E9
| 573752 ||  || — || January 27, 2007 || Kitt Peak || Spacewatch ||  || align=right data-sort-value="0.84" | 840 m || 
|-id=753 bgcolor=#E9E9E9
| 573753 ||  || — || April 7, 2003 || Kitt Peak || Spacewatch ||  || align=right | 1.4 km || 
|-id=754 bgcolor=#E9E9E9
| 573754 ||  || — || October 30, 2005 || Kitt Peak || Spacewatch ||  || align=right | 1.1 km || 
|-id=755 bgcolor=#C2FFFF
| 573755 ||  || — || September 18, 2009 || Kitt Peak || Spacewatch || L4 || align=right | 6.3 km || 
|-id=756 bgcolor=#d6d6d6
| 573756 ||  || — || August 29, 2009 || Kitt Peak || Spacewatch ||  || align=right | 2.3 km || 
|-id=757 bgcolor=#d6d6d6
| 573757 ||  || — || September 22, 2003 || Kitt Peak || Spacewatch || 7:4 || align=right | 2.8 km || 
|-id=758 bgcolor=#E9E9E9
| 573758 ||  || — || February 23, 2007 || Kitt Peak || Spacewatch ||  || align=right | 1.5 km || 
|-id=759 bgcolor=#C2FFFF
| 573759 ||  || — || September 17, 2009 || Zelenchukskaya Stn || T. V. Kryachko, B. Satovski || L4 || align=right | 8.0 km || 
|-id=760 bgcolor=#E9E9E9
| 573760 ||  || — || March 13, 2003 || Kitt Peak || Spacewatch ||  || align=right data-sort-value="0.89" | 890 m || 
|-id=761 bgcolor=#FA8072
| 573761 ||  || — || September 17, 2009 || Kitt Peak || Spacewatch ||  || align=right data-sort-value="0.29" | 290 m || 
|-id=762 bgcolor=#E9E9E9
| 573762 ||  || — || October 21, 2001 || Kitt Peak || Spacewatch ||  || align=right data-sort-value="0.69" | 690 m || 
|-id=763 bgcolor=#E9E9E9
| 573763 ||  || — || August 27, 2009 || Kitt Peak || Spacewatch ||  || align=right | 1.2 km || 
|-id=764 bgcolor=#E9E9E9
| 573764 ||  || — || October 28, 2005 || Mount Lemmon || Mount Lemmon Survey ||  || align=right | 1.4 km || 
|-id=765 bgcolor=#d6d6d6
| 573765 ||  || — || September 16, 2009 || Kitt Peak || Spacewatch ||  || align=right | 3.1 km || 
|-id=766 bgcolor=#E9E9E9
| 573766 ||  || — || September 16, 2009 || Kitt Peak || Spacewatch ||  || align=right | 1.8 km || 
|-id=767 bgcolor=#E9E9E9
| 573767 ||  || — || September 23, 2009 || Mount Lemmon || Mount Lemmon Survey ||  || align=right data-sort-value="0.74" | 740 m || 
|-id=768 bgcolor=#E9E9E9
| 573768 ||  || — || March 26, 2007 || Mount Lemmon || Mount Lemmon Survey ||  || align=right | 1.6 km || 
|-id=769 bgcolor=#E9E9E9
| 573769 ||  || — || October 26, 2005 || Kitt Peak || Spacewatch ||  || align=right | 1.4 km || 
|-id=770 bgcolor=#E9E9E9
| 573770 ||  || — || September 29, 2009 || Mount Lemmon || Mount Lemmon Survey ||  || align=right | 1.4 km || 
|-id=771 bgcolor=#E9E9E9
| 573771 ||  || — || December 27, 2005 || Mount Lemmon || Mount Lemmon Survey ||  || align=right | 1.7 km || 
|-id=772 bgcolor=#E9E9E9
| 573772 ||  || — || September 18, 2009 || Catalina || CSS ||  || align=right | 1.5 km || 
|-id=773 bgcolor=#E9E9E9
| 573773 ||  || — || August 29, 2009 || Kitt Peak || Spacewatch ||  || align=right | 1.1 km || 
|-id=774 bgcolor=#E9E9E9
| 573774 ||  || — || March 14, 2016 || Haleakala || Pan-STARRS ||  || align=right data-sort-value="0.77" | 770 m || 
|-id=775 bgcolor=#d6d6d6
| 573775 ||  || — || May 13, 2013 || Mount Lemmon || Mount Lemmon Survey ||  || align=right | 2.4 km || 
|-id=776 bgcolor=#E9E9E9
| 573776 ||  || — || January 15, 2015 || Haleakala || Pan-STARRS ||  || align=right data-sort-value="0.98" | 980 m || 
|-id=777 bgcolor=#E9E9E9
| 573777 ||  || — || December 15, 2014 || Mount Lemmon || Mount Lemmon Survey ||  || align=right | 1.4 km || 
|-id=778 bgcolor=#d6d6d6
| 573778 ||  || — || October 12, 2016 || Mount Lemmon || Mount Lemmon Survey || 7:4 || align=right | 3.2 km || 
|-id=779 bgcolor=#E9E9E9
| 573779 ||  || — || March 16, 2016 || Mount Lemmon || Mount Lemmon Survey ||  || align=right data-sort-value="0.75" | 750 m || 
|-id=780 bgcolor=#E9E9E9
| 573780 ||  || — || August 15, 2013 || Haleakala || Pan-STARRS ||  || align=right data-sort-value="0.82" | 820 m || 
|-id=781 bgcolor=#d6d6d6
| 573781 ||  || — || September 28, 2009 || Mount Lemmon || Mount Lemmon Survey || 7:4 || align=right | 2.6 km || 
|-id=782 bgcolor=#d6d6d6
| 573782 ||  || — || February 23, 2012 || Mount Lemmon || Mount Lemmon Survey ||  || align=right | 2.4 km || 
|-id=783 bgcolor=#E9E9E9
| 573783 ||  || — || September 28, 2009 || Kitt Peak || Spacewatch ||  || align=right | 1.2 km || 
|-id=784 bgcolor=#d6d6d6
| 573784 ||  || — || September 27, 2009 || Kitt Peak || Spacewatch ||  || align=right | 2.5 km || 
|-id=785 bgcolor=#d6d6d6
| 573785 ||  || — || April 10, 2013 || Haleakala || Pan-STARRS ||  || align=right | 2.2 km || 
|-id=786 bgcolor=#d6d6d6
| 573786 ||  || — || September 1, 2014 || Kitt Peak || Spacewatch ||  || align=right | 2.3 km || 
|-id=787 bgcolor=#d6d6d6
| 573787 ||  || — || September 19, 2009 || Mount Lemmon || Mount Lemmon Survey ||  || align=right | 2.4 km || 
|-id=788 bgcolor=#d6d6d6
| 573788 ||  || — || March 17, 2012 || Mount Lemmon || Mount Lemmon Survey || 3:2 || align=right | 3.5 km || 
|-id=789 bgcolor=#E9E9E9
| 573789 ||  || — || September 17, 2009 || Kitt Peak || Spacewatch ||  || align=right | 1.8 km || 
|-id=790 bgcolor=#d6d6d6
| 573790 ||  || — || December 13, 2010 || Kitt Peak || Spacewatch ||  || align=right | 2.4 km || 
|-id=791 bgcolor=#E9E9E9
| 573791 ||  || — || September 16, 2009 || Kitt Peak || Spacewatch ||  || align=right | 1.2 km || 
|-id=792 bgcolor=#d6d6d6
| 573792 ||  || — || September 28, 2009 || Mount Lemmon || Mount Lemmon Survey || 7:4 || align=right | 2.7 km || 
|-id=793 bgcolor=#C2FFFF
| 573793 ||  || — || September 20, 2009 || Kitt Peak || Spacewatch || L4 || align=right | 9.3 km || 
|-id=794 bgcolor=#E9E9E9
| 573794 ||  || — || September 29, 2009 || Mount Lemmon || Mount Lemmon Survey ||  || align=right | 1.5 km || 
|-id=795 bgcolor=#E9E9E9
| 573795 ||  || — || September 28, 2009 || Mount Lemmon || Mount Lemmon Survey ||  || align=right | 1.7 km || 
|-id=796 bgcolor=#d6d6d6
| 573796 ||  || — || September 27, 2009 || Mount Lemmon || Mount Lemmon Survey ||  || align=right | 2.1 km || 
|-id=797 bgcolor=#d6d6d6
| 573797 ||  || — || September 28, 2009 || Mount Lemmon || Mount Lemmon Survey || 7:4 || align=right | 2.6 km || 
|-id=798 bgcolor=#d6d6d6
| 573798 ||  || — || September 27, 2009 || Kitt Peak || Spacewatch ||  || align=right | 1.7 km || 
|-id=799 bgcolor=#E9E9E9
| 573799 ||  || — || September 27, 2009 || Kitt Peak || Spacewatch ||  || align=right | 2.0 km || 
|-id=800 bgcolor=#E9E9E9
| 573800 ||  || — || October 12, 2009 || Marly || P. Kocher ||  || align=right | 2.5 km || 
|}

573801–573900 

|-bgcolor=#E9E9E9
| 573801 ||  || — || October 14, 2009 || Bergisch Gladbach || W. Bickel ||  || align=right | 1.9 km || 
|-id=802 bgcolor=#fefefe
| 573802 ||  || — || October 6, 2002 || Palomar || NEAT ||  || align=right data-sort-value="0.52" | 520 m || 
|-id=803 bgcolor=#E9E9E9
| 573803 ||  || — || October 29, 2005 || Kitt Peak || Spacewatch ||  || align=right data-sort-value="0.59" | 590 m || 
|-id=804 bgcolor=#d6d6d6
| 573804 ||  || — || September 29, 2009 || Mount Lemmon || Mount Lemmon Survey ||  || align=right | 1.7 km || 
|-id=805 bgcolor=#E9E9E9
| 573805 ||  || — || October 15, 2009 || Mount Lemmon || Mount Lemmon Survey ||  || align=right | 2.3 km || 
|-id=806 bgcolor=#E9E9E9
| 573806 ||  || — || May 16, 2012 || Mount Lemmon || Mount Lemmon Survey ||  || align=right data-sort-value="0.97" | 970 m || 
|-id=807 bgcolor=#fefefe
| 573807 ||  || — || March 2, 2016 || Kitt Peak || Spacewatch || H || align=right data-sort-value="0.59" | 590 m || 
|-id=808 bgcolor=#C2FFFF
| 573808 ||  || — || October 1, 2009 || Mount Lemmon || Mount Lemmon Survey || L4 || align=right | 9.2 km || 
|-id=809 bgcolor=#E9E9E9
| 573809 ||  || — || November 29, 2014 || Mount Lemmon || Mount Lemmon Survey ||  || align=right | 2.2 km || 
|-id=810 bgcolor=#fefefe
| 573810 ||  || — || October 15, 2009 || Mount Lemmon || Mount Lemmon Survey ||  || align=right data-sort-value="0.65" | 650 m || 
|-id=811 bgcolor=#E9E9E9
| 573811 ||  || — || September 18, 2009 || Mount Lemmon || Mount Lemmon Survey ||  || align=right data-sort-value="0.77" | 770 m || 
|-id=812 bgcolor=#E9E9E9
| 573812 ||  || — || October 17, 2009 || Catalina || CSS ||  || align=right | 2.5 km || 
|-id=813 bgcolor=#E9E9E9
| 573813 ||  || — || October 16, 2009 || Mount Lemmon || Mount Lemmon Survey ||  || align=right | 1.0 km || 
|-id=814 bgcolor=#E9E9E9
| 573814 ||  || — || October 19, 2009 || Zelenchukskaya Stn || T. V. Kryachko, B. Satovski || HNS || align=right | 1.5 km || 
|-id=815 bgcolor=#E9E9E9
| 573815 ||  || — || October 22, 2009 || Mount Lemmon || Mount Lemmon Survey ||  || align=right | 1.1 km || 
|-id=816 bgcolor=#E9E9E9
| 573816 ||  || — || September 24, 2009 || Crni Vrh || J. Vales || EUN || align=right | 1.6 km || 
|-id=817 bgcolor=#fefefe
| 573817 ||  || — || October 15, 2009 || Kitt Peak || Spacewatch ||  || align=right data-sort-value="0.50" | 500 m || 
|-id=818 bgcolor=#E9E9E9
| 573818 ||  || — || October 21, 2009 || Catalina || CSS || RAF || align=right data-sort-value="0.65" | 650 m || 
|-id=819 bgcolor=#E9E9E9
| 573819 ||  || — || October 18, 2009 || Mount Lemmon || Mount Lemmon Survey ||  || align=right data-sort-value="0.92" | 920 m || 
|-id=820 bgcolor=#E9E9E9
| 573820 ||  || — || October 18, 2009 || Mount Lemmon || Mount Lemmon Survey ||  || align=right | 1.1 km || 
|-id=821 bgcolor=#E9E9E9
| 573821 ||  || — || April 1, 2003 || Palomar || NEAT ||  || align=right | 1.8 km || 
|-id=822 bgcolor=#E9E9E9
| 573822 ||  || — || September 22, 2009 || Mount Lemmon || Mount Lemmon Survey ||  || align=right data-sort-value="0.78" | 780 m || 
|-id=823 bgcolor=#E9E9E9
| 573823 ||  || — || October 18, 2009 || Mount Lemmon || Mount Lemmon Survey ||  || align=right | 1.6 km || 
|-id=824 bgcolor=#E9E9E9
| 573824 ||  || — || January 26, 2007 || Kitt Peak || Spacewatch ||  || align=right | 1.4 km || 
|-id=825 bgcolor=#fefefe
| 573825 ||  || — || September 14, 2009 || Kitt Peak || Spacewatch ||  || align=right data-sort-value="0.75" | 750 m || 
|-id=826 bgcolor=#E9E9E9
| 573826 ||  || — || October 30, 2005 || Mount Lemmon || Mount Lemmon Survey ||  || align=right data-sort-value="0.89" | 890 m || 
|-id=827 bgcolor=#C2FFFF
| 573827 ||  || — || October 23, 2009 || Mount Lemmon || Mount Lemmon Survey || L4 || align=right | 7.4 km || 
|-id=828 bgcolor=#E9E9E9
| 573828 ||  || — || October 17, 2009 || Mount Lemmon || Mount Lemmon Survey ||  || align=right | 1.4 km || 
|-id=829 bgcolor=#d6d6d6
| 573829 ||  || — || September 29, 2009 || Kitt Peak || Spacewatch ||  || align=right | 2.0 km || 
|-id=830 bgcolor=#E9E9E9
| 573830 ||  || — || September 16, 2009 || Kitt Peak || Spacewatch ||  || align=right | 1.1 km || 
|-id=831 bgcolor=#E9E9E9
| 573831 ||  || — || September 18, 2009 || Kitt Peak || Spacewatch ||  || align=right | 1.8 km || 
|-id=832 bgcolor=#E9E9E9
| 573832 ||  || — || January 22, 2006 || Mount Lemmon || Mount Lemmon Survey ||  || align=right | 1.8 km || 
|-id=833 bgcolor=#fefefe
| 573833 ||  || — || October 24, 2009 || Catalina || CSS ||  || align=right data-sort-value="0.82" | 820 m || 
|-id=834 bgcolor=#E9E9E9
| 573834 ||  || — || October 21, 2009 || Mount Lemmon || Mount Lemmon Survey ||  || align=right | 1.5 km || 
|-id=835 bgcolor=#C2FFFF
| 573835 ||  || — || October 21, 2009 || Mount Lemmon || Mount Lemmon Survey || L4 || align=right | 9.3 km || 
|-id=836 bgcolor=#E9E9E9
| 573836 ||  || — || October 22, 2009 || Mount Lemmon || Mount Lemmon Survey ||  || align=right | 1.1 km || 
|-id=837 bgcolor=#E9E9E9
| 573837 ||  || — || October 24, 2009 || Kitt Peak || Spacewatch ||  || align=right | 1.6 km || 
|-id=838 bgcolor=#E9E9E9
| 573838 ||  || — || September 16, 2009 || Kitt Peak || Spacewatch ||  || align=right | 1.6 km || 
|-id=839 bgcolor=#E9E9E9
| 573839 ||  || — || October 22, 2009 || Mount Lemmon || Mount Lemmon Survey ||  || align=right | 1.2 km || 
|-id=840 bgcolor=#d6d6d6
| 573840 ||  || — || October 23, 2009 || Mount Lemmon || Mount Lemmon Survey ||  || align=right | 2.2 km || 
|-id=841 bgcolor=#C2FFFF
| 573841 ||  || — || October 9, 2008 || Mount Lemmon || Mount Lemmon Survey || L4 || align=right | 7.3 km || 
|-id=842 bgcolor=#E9E9E9
| 573842 ||  || — || October 26, 2009 || Mount Lemmon || Mount Lemmon Survey ||  || align=right | 1.7 km || 
|-id=843 bgcolor=#E9E9E9
| 573843 ||  || — || August 17, 2009 || Kitt Peak || Spacewatch ||  || align=right | 1.1 km || 
|-id=844 bgcolor=#E9E9E9
| 573844 ||  || — || October 27, 2009 || Kitt Peak || Spacewatch ||  || align=right data-sort-value="0.85" | 850 m || 
|-id=845 bgcolor=#E9E9E9
| 573845 ||  || — || October 17, 2009 || Catalina || CSS ||  || align=right data-sort-value="0.84" | 840 m || 
|-id=846 bgcolor=#E9E9E9
| 573846 ||  || — || May 20, 2012 || Haleakala || Pan-STARRS ||  || align=right | 1.0 km || 
|-id=847 bgcolor=#fefefe
| 573847 ||  || — || October 18, 2009 || Mount Lemmon || Mount Lemmon Survey ||  || align=right data-sort-value="0.53" | 530 m || 
|-id=848 bgcolor=#C2FFFF
| 573848 ||  || — || October 23, 2009 || Mount Lemmon || Mount Lemmon Survey || L4 || align=right | 9.9 km || 
|-id=849 bgcolor=#E9E9E9
| 573849 ||  || — || October 16, 2009 || Mount Lemmon || Mount Lemmon Survey ||  || align=right | 2.2 km || 
|-id=850 bgcolor=#E9E9E9
| 573850 ||  || — || April 9, 2016 || Haleakala || Pan-STARRS ||  || align=right data-sort-value="0.97" | 970 m || 
|-id=851 bgcolor=#E9E9E9
| 573851 ||  || — || October 23, 2009 || Mount Lemmon || Mount Lemmon Survey ||  || align=right | 1.7 km || 
|-id=852 bgcolor=#E9E9E9
| 573852 ||  || — || October 23, 2009 || Mount Lemmon || Mount Lemmon Survey ||  || align=right | 1.8 km || 
|-id=853 bgcolor=#d6d6d6
| 573853 ||  || — || October 23, 2009 || Mount Lemmon || Mount Lemmon Survey ||  || align=right | 2.5 km || 
|-id=854 bgcolor=#d6d6d6
| 573854 ||  || — || October 27, 2009 || Mount Lemmon || Mount Lemmon Survey ||  || align=right | 3.2 km || 
|-id=855 bgcolor=#C2FFFF
| 573855 ||  || — || November 2, 2010 || Mount Lemmon || Mount Lemmon Survey || L4 || align=right | 8.5 km || 
|-id=856 bgcolor=#fefefe
| 573856 ||  || — || October 26, 2009 || Kitt Peak || Spacewatch ||  || align=right data-sort-value="0.71" | 710 m || 
|-id=857 bgcolor=#E9E9E9
| 573857 ||  || — || October 18, 2009 || Mount Lemmon || Mount Lemmon Survey ||  || align=right | 1.1 km || 
|-id=858 bgcolor=#d6d6d6
| 573858 ||  || — || October 27, 2009 || Kitt Peak || Spacewatch ||  || align=right | 2.2 km || 
|-id=859 bgcolor=#E9E9E9
| 573859 ||  || — || October 23, 2009 || Mount Lemmon || Mount Lemmon Survey ||  || align=right | 2.1 km || 
|-id=860 bgcolor=#E9E9E9
| 573860 ||  || — || October 27, 2009 || Kitt Peak || Spacewatch ||  || align=right | 1.3 km || 
|-id=861 bgcolor=#E9E9E9
| 573861 ||  || — || November 8, 2009 || Catalina || CSS ||  || align=right | 1.8 km || 
|-id=862 bgcolor=#E9E9E9
| 573862 ||  || — || November 8, 2009 || Mount Lemmon || Mount Lemmon Survey ||  || align=right | 1.4 km || 
|-id=863 bgcolor=#E9E9E9
| 573863 ||  || — || November 8, 2009 || Mount Lemmon || Mount Lemmon Survey ||  || align=right | 1.00 km || 
|-id=864 bgcolor=#E9E9E9
| 573864 ||  || — || November 8, 2009 || Mount Lemmon || Mount Lemmon Survey ||  || align=right | 1.1 km || 
|-id=865 bgcolor=#E9E9E9
| 573865 ||  || — || November 8, 2009 || Mount Lemmon || Mount Lemmon Survey ||  || align=right | 1.5 km || 
|-id=866 bgcolor=#E9E9E9
| 573866 ||  || — || November 8, 2009 || Mount Lemmon || Mount Lemmon Survey ||  || align=right | 1.6 km || 
|-id=867 bgcolor=#fefefe
| 573867 ||  || — || September 22, 2009 || Mount Lemmon || Mount Lemmon Survey ||  || align=right data-sort-value="0.54" | 540 m || 
|-id=868 bgcolor=#E9E9E9
| 573868 ||  || — || July 28, 2008 || Mount Lemmon || Mount Lemmon Survey ||  || align=right | 2.6 km || 
|-id=869 bgcolor=#E9E9E9
| 573869 ||  || — || November 9, 2009 || Kitt Peak || Spacewatch ||  || align=right | 1.4 km || 
|-id=870 bgcolor=#E9E9E9
| 573870 ||  || — || March 15, 2007 || Kitt Peak || Spacewatch ||  || align=right | 1.2 km || 
|-id=871 bgcolor=#E9E9E9
| 573871 ||  || — || January 8, 2006 || Kitt Peak || Spacewatch ||  || align=right | 1.8 km || 
|-id=872 bgcolor=#fefefe
| 573872 ||  || — || November 9, 2009 || Mount Lemmon || Mount Lemmon Survey ||  || align=right data-sort-value="0.80" | 800 m || 
|-id=873 bgcolor=#E9E9E9
| 573873 ||  || — || September 19, 2009 || Mount Lemmon || Mount Lemmon Survey ||  || align=right | 1.6 km || 
|-id=874 bgcolor=#E9E9E9
| 573874 ||  || — || July 30, 2008 || Mount Lemmon || Mount Lemmon Survey ||  || align=right | 3.2 km || 
|-id=875 bgcolor=#d6d6d6
| 573875 ||  || — || October 24, 2009 || Kitt Peak || Spacewatch ||  || align=right | 2.0 km || 
|-id=876 bgcolor=#E9E9E9
| 573876 ||  || — || November 2, 2000 || Kitt Peak || Spacewatch ||  || align=right | 1.9 km || 
|-id=877 bgcolor=#d6d6d6
| 573877 ||  || — || November 10, 2009 || Mount Lemmon || Mount Lemmon Survey ||  || align=right | 2.8 km || 
|-id=878 bgcolor=#fefefe
| 573878 ||  || — || September 22, 2009 || Mount Lemmon || Mount Lemmon Survey ||  || align=right data-sort-value="0.63" | 630 m || 
|-id=879 bgcolor=#E9E9E9
| 573879 ||  || — || November 12, 2009 || La Sagra || OAM Obs. ||  || align=right data-sort-value="0.80" | 800 m || 
|-id=880 bgcolor=#C2FFFF
| 573880 ||  || — || September 21, 2009 || Mount Lemmon || Mount Lemmon Survey || L4 || align=right | 7.7 km || 
|-id=881 bgcolor=#E9E9E9
| 573881 ||  || — || July 20, 2004 || Siding Spring || SSS ||  || align=right | 1.1 km || 
|-id=882 bgcolor=#E9E9E9
| 573882 ||  || — || October 23, 2009 || Mount Lemmon || Mount Lemmon Survey ||  || align=right | 1.3 km || 
|-id=883 bgcolor=#E9E9E9
| 573883 ||  || — || September 21, 2009 || Mount Lemmon || Mount Lemmon Survey ||  || align=right | 1.1 km || 
|-id=884 bgcolor=#E9E9E9
| 573884 ||  || — || October 23, 2009 || Mount Lemmon || Mount Lemmon Survey ||  || align=right | 2.2 km || 
|-id=885 bgcolor=#E9E9E9
| 573885 ||  || — || October 30, 2009 || Mount Lemmon || Mount Lemmon Survey ||  || align=right | 1.3 km || 
|-id=886 bgcolor=#E9E9E9
| 573886 ||  || — || November 9, 2009 || Kitt Peak || Spacewatch ||  || align=right | 1.6 km || 
|-id=887 bgcolor=#E9E9E9
| 573887 ||  || — || November 10, 2009 || Kitt Peak || Spacewatch ||  || align=right | 1.1 km || 
|-id=888 bgcolor=#E9E9E9
| 573888 ||  || — || March 15, 2002 || Mount Hamilton || Lick Obs. ||  || align=right | 1.6 km || 
|-id=889 bgcolor=#E9E9E9
| 573889 ||  || — || November 8, 2009 || Catalina || CSS ||  || align=right | 1.7 km || 
|-id=890 bgcolor=#E9E9E9
| 573890 ||  || — || January 7, 2006 || Kitt Peak || Spacewatch ||  || align=right data-sort-value="0.78" | 780 m || 
|-id=891 bgcolor=#E9E9E9
| 573891 ||  || — || April 20, 2007 || Kitt Peak || Spacewatch ||  || align=right | 1.5 km || 
|-id=892 bgcolor=#E9E9E9
| 573892 ||  || — || November 10, 2009 || Kitt Peak || Spacewatch ||  || align=right | 1.6 km || 
|-id=893 bgcolor=#fefefe
| 573893 ||  || — || November 10, 2009 || Kitt Peak || Spacewatch ||  || align=right data-sort-value="0.48" | 480 m || 
|-id=894 bgcolor=#E9E9E9
| 573894 ||  || — || September 22, 2009 || Mount Lemmon || Mount Lemmon Survey ||  || align=right data-sort-value="0.98" | 980 m || 
|-id=895 bgcolor=#E9E9E9
| 573895 ||  || — || November 9, 2009 || Mount Lemmon || Mount Lemmon Survey ||  || align=right data-sort-value="0.70" | 700 m || 
|-id=896 bgcolor=#E9E9E9
| 573896 ||  || — || November 10, 2009 || Mount Lemmon || Mount Lemmon Survey ||  || align=right data-sort-value="0.83" | 830 m || 
|-id=897 bgcolor=#fefefe
| 573897 ||  || — || November 26, 2013 || Haleakala || Pan-STARRS ||  || align=right data-sort-value="0.74" | 740 m || 
|-id=898 bgcolor=#E9E9E9
| 573898 ||  || — || November 8, 2009 || Mount Lemmon || Mount Lemmon Survey ||  || align=right | 1.6 km || 
|-id=899 bgcolor=#fefefe
| 573899 ||  || — || October 17, 2009 || Mount Lemmon || Mount Lemmon Survey ||  || align=right data-sort-value="0.56" | 560 m || 
|-id=900 bgcolor=#fefefe
| 573900 ||  || — || October 25, 2009 || Kitt Peak || Spacewatch || H || align=right data-sort-value="0.54" | 540 m || 
|}

573901–574000 

|-bgcolor=#E9E9E9
| 573901 ||  || — || November 9, 2009 || Kitt Peak || Spacewatch ||  || align=right data-sort-value="0.88" | 880 m || 
|-id=902 bgcolor=#E9E9E9
| 573902 ||  || — || October 12, 2013 || Mount Lemmon || Mount Lemmon Survey ||  || align=right | 1.4 km || 
|-id=903 bgcolor=#E9E9E9
| 573903 ||  || — || November 9, 2009 || Mount Lemmon || Mount Lemmon Survey ||  || align=right | 1.9 km || 
|-id=904 bgcolor=#E9E9E9
| 573904 ||  || — || November 16, 2009 || Kitt Peak || Spacewatch ||  || align=right | 2.1 km || 
|-id=905 bgcolor=#E9E9E9
| 573905 ||  || — || May 1, 2003 || Kitt Peak || Spacewatch ||  || align=right | 1.7 km || 
|-id=906 bgcolor=#E9E9E9
| 573906 ||  || — || November 17, 2009 || Kitt Peak || Spacewatch ||  || align=right data-sort-value="0.89" | 890 m || 
|-id=907 bgcolor=#fefefe
| 573907 ||  || — || November 17, 2009 || Kitt Peak || Spacewatch ||  || align=right data-sort-value="0.52" | 520 m || 
|-id=908 bgcolor=#E9E9E9
| 573908 ||  || — || November 17, 2009 || Mount Lemmon || Mount Lemmon Survey ||  || align=right | 1.4 km || 
|-id=909 bgcolor=#E9E9E9
| 573909 ||  || — || January 9, 2006 || Kitt Peak || Spacewatch ||  || align=right | 1.5 km || 
|-id=910 bgcolor=#E9E9E9
| 573910 ||  || — || October 22, 2009 || Mount Lemmon || Mount Lemmon Survey ||  || align=right | 1.3 km || 
|-id=911 bgcolor=#d6d6d6
| 573911 ||  || — || October 23, 2009 || Mount Lemmon || Mount Lemmon Survey ||  || align=right | 2.2 km || 
|-id=912 bgcolor=#E9E9E9
| 573912 ||  || — || September 19, 2009 || Mount Lemmon || Mount Lemmon Survey ||  || align=right | 1.9 km || 
|-id=913 bgcolor=#d6d6d6
| 573913 ||  || — || October 18, 2009 || Mount Lemmon || Mount Lemmon Survey ||  || align=right | 1.9 km || 
|-id=914 bgcolor=#E9E9E9
| 573914 ||  || — || November 18, 2009 || Kitt Peak || Spacewatch ||  || align=right | 2.0 km || 
|-id=915 bgcolor=#E9E9E9
| 573915 ||  || — || November 8, 2009 || Mount Lemmon || Mount Lemmon Survey ||  || align=right data-sort-value="0.92" | 920 m || 
|-id=916 bgcolor=#E9E9E9
| 573916 ||  || — || September 20, 2009 || Mount Lemmon || Mount Lemmon Survey ||  || align=right | 2.0 km || 
|-id=917 bgcolor=#E9E9E9
| 573917 ||  || — || November 18, 2009 || Kitt Peak || Spacewatch ||  || align=right | 1.8 km || 
|-id=918 bgcolor=#E9E9E9
| 573918 ||  || — || November 11, 2009 || Kitt Peak || Spacewatch ||  || align=right data-sort-value="0.89" | 890 m || 
|-id=919 bgcolor=#d6d6d6
| 573919 ||  || — || November 9, 2009 || Mount Lemmon || Mount Lemmon Survey ||  || align=right | 2.5 km || 
|-id=920 bgcolor=#E9E9E9
| 573920 ||  || — || November 25, 2005 || Kitt Peak || Spacewatch ||  || align=right | 1.1 km || 
|-id=921 bgcolor=#E9E9E9
| 573921 ||  || — || December 5, 2005 || Mount Lemmon || Mount Lemmon Survey ||  || align=right | 1.1 km || 
|-id=922 bgcolor=#E9E9E9
| 573922 ||  || — || November 19, 2008 || Mount Lemmon || Mount Lemmon Survey ||  || align=right | 1.8 km || 
|-id=923 bgcolor=#E9E9E9
| 573923 ||  || — || November 19, 2009 || Mount Lemmon || Mount Lemmon Survey ||  || align=right | 1.9 km || 
|-id=924 bgcolor=#E9E9E9
| 573924 ||  || — || October 27, 2005 || Kitt Peak || Spacewatch ||  || align=right | 1.0 km || 
|-id=925 bgcolor=#E9E9E9
| 573925 ||  || — || November 20, 2009 || Mount Lemmon || Mount Lemmon Survey ||  || align=right | 1.4 km || 
|-id=926 bgcolor=#E9E9E9
| 573926 ||  || — || November 22, 2009 || Kitt Peak || Spacewatch ||  || align=right | 1.3 km || 
|-id=927 bgcolor=#E9E9E9
| 573927 ||  || — || November 22, 2009 || Mount Lemmon || Mount Lemmon Survey ||  || align=right | 1.6 km || 
|-id=928 bgcolor=#E9E9E9
| 573928 ||  || — || November 21, 2009 || Modra || Modra Obs. ||  || align=right data-sort-value="0.85" | 850 m || 
|-id=929 bgcolor=#E9E9E9
| 573929 ||  || — || April 24, 2003 || Kitt Peak || Spacewatch ||  || align=right | 1.5 km || 
|-id=930 bgcolor=#d6d6d6
| 573930 ||  || — || November 17, 2009 || Mount Lemmon || Mount Lemmon Survey ||  || align=right | 2.4 km || 
|-id=931 bgcolor=#E9E9E9
| 573931 ||  || — || March 31, 2003 || Kitt Peak || Spacewatch ||  || align=right | 1.6 km || 
|-id=932 bgcolor=#C2FFFF
| 573932 ||  || — || October 23, 2009 || Mount Lemmon || Mount Lemmon Survey || L4 || align=right | 11 km || 
|-id=933 bgcolor=#E9E9E9
| 573933 ||  || — || September 29, 2009 || Kitt Peak || Spacewatch ||  || align=right | 1.7 km || 
|-id=934 bgcolor=#d6d6d6
| 573934 ||  || — || September 22, 2009 || Mount Lemmon || Mount Lemmon Survey ||  || align=right | 3.0 km || 
|-id=935 bgcolor=#E9E9E9
| 573935 ||  || — || November 20, 2009 || Kitt Peak || Spacewatch ||  || align=right | 1.3 km || 
|-id=936 bgcolor=#E9E9E9
| 573936 ||  || — || November 20, 2009 || Kitt Peak || Spacewatch ||  || align=right | 1.2 km || 
|-id=937 bgcolor=#fefefe
| 573937 ||  || — || November 20, 2009 || Mount Lemmon || Mount Lemmon Survey ||  || align=right data-sort-value="0.48" | 480 m || 
|-id=938 bgcolor=#E9E9E9
| 573938 ||  || — || November 22, 2009 || Catalina || CSS ||  || align=right | 1.5 km || 
|-id=939 bgcolor=#E9E9E9
| 573939 ||  || — || November 23, 2009 || Kitt Peak || Spacewatch ||  || align=right | 1.3 km || 
|-id=940 bgcolor=#E9E9E9
| 573940 ||  || — || April 29, 2003 || Kitt Peak || Spacewatch ||  || align=right | 1.4 km || 
|-id=941 bgcolor=#E9E9E9
| 573941 ||  || — || November 23, 2009 || Mount Lemmon || Mount Lemmon Survey ||  || align=right data-sort-value="0.90" | 900 m || 
|-id=942 bgcolor=#E9E9E9
| 573942 ||  || — || April 22, 2007 || Mount Lemmon || Mount Lemmon Survey ||  || align=right | 1.7 km || 
|-id=943 bgcolor=#E9E9E9
| 573943 ||  || — || December 19, 2001 || Kitt Peak || Spacewatch ||  || align=right | 1.5 km || 
|-id=944 bgcolor=#E9E9E9
| 573944 ||  || — || July 16, 2004 || Cerro Tololo || Cerro Tololo Obs. ||  || align=right data-sort-value="0.67" | 670 m || 
|-id=945 bgcolor=#d6d6d6
| 573945 ||  || — || November 18, 2009 || Mount Lemmon || Mount Lemmon Survey ||  || align=right | 2.0 km || 
|-id=946 bgcolor=#E9E9E9
| 573946 ||  || — || November 11, 2009 || Kitt Peak || Spacewatch ||  || align=right data-sort-value="0.89" | 890 m || 
|-id=947 bgcolor=#E9E9E9
| 573947 ||  || — || November 19, 2009 || Mount Lemmon || Mount Lemmon Survey ||  || align=right data-sort-value="0.78" | 780 m || 
|-id=948 bgcolor=#E9E9E9
| 573948 ||  || — || October 12, 2009 || Mount Lemmon || Mount Lemmon Survey ||  || align=right data-sort-value="0.67" | 670 m || 
|-id=949 bgcolor=#E9E9E9
| 573949 ||  || — || November 19, 2009 || Mount Lemmon || Mount Lemmon Survey ||  || align=right | 1.2 km || 
|-id=950 bgcolor=#E9E9E9
| 573950 ||  || — || November 19, 2009 || Mount Lemmon || Mount Lemmon Survey ||  || align=right | 1.4 km || 
|-id=951 bgcolor=#E9E9E9
| 573951 ||  || — || October 27, 2009 || Mount Lemmon || Mount Lemmon Survey ||  || align=right | 1.4 km || 
|-id=952 bgcolor=#E9E9E9
| 573952 ||  || — || November 21, 2009 || Kitt Peak || Spacewatch ||  || align=right | 1.4 km || 
|-id=953 bgcolor=#E9E9E9
| 573953 ||  || — || March 13, 2007 || Kitt Peak || Spacewatch ||  || align=right | 1.4 km || 
|-id=954 bgcolor=#E9E9E9
| 573954 ||  || — || November 9, 2009 || Mount Lemmon || Mount Lemmon Survey ||  || align=right | 1.6 km || 
|-id=955 bgcolor=#d6d6d6
| 573955 ||  || — || April 19, 2006 || Mount Lemmon || Mount Lemmon Survey ||  || align=right | 2.7 km || 
|-id=956 bgcolor=#fefefe
| 573956 ||  || — || August 28, 2005 || Kitt Peak || Spacewatch ||  || align=right data-sort-value="0.78" | 780 m || 
|-id=957 bgcolor=#E9E9E9
| 573957 ||  || — || November 22, 2009 || Kitt Peak || Spacewatch ||  || align=right data-sort-value="0.72" | 720 m || 
|-id=958 bgcolor=#E9E9E9
| 573958 ||  || — || December 6, 2005 || Kitt Peak || Spacewatch ||  || align=right | 1.00 km || 
|-id=959 bgcolor=#E9E9E9
| 573959 ||  || — || November 11, 2009 || Kitt Peak || Spacewatch ||  || align=right | 1.7 km || 
|-id=960 bgcolor=#d6d6d6
| 573960 ||  || — || September 4, 2008 || Kitt Peak || Spacewatch || 7:4 || align=right | 3.4 km || 
|-id=961 bgcolor=#d6d6d6
| 573961 ||  || — || November 23, 2009 || Kitt Peak || Spacewatch || 7:4 || align=right | 3.2 km || 
|-id=962 bgcolor=#E9E9E9
| 573962 ||  || — || December 25, 2005 || Kitt Peak || Spacewatch ||  || align=right | 1.3 km || 
|-id=963 bgcolor=#C2FFFF
| 573963 ||  || — || October 9, 2008 || Mount Lemmon || Mount Lemmon Survey || L4 || align=right | 6.4 km || 
|-id=964 bgcolor=#E9E9E9
| 573964 ||  || — || October 24, 2009 || Kitt Peak || Spacewatch ||  || align=right data-sort-value="0.93" | 930 m || 
|-id=965 bgcolor=#E9E9E9
| 573965 ||  || — || October 2, 2000 || Apache Point || SDSS Collaboration ||  || align=right | 1.8 km || 
|-id=966 bgcolor=#E9E9E9
| 573966 ||  || — || September 7, 2004 || Kitt Peak || Spacewatch ||  || align=right | 1.2 km || 
|-id=967 bgcolor=#E9E9E9
| 573967 ||  || — || November 17, 2009 || Kitt Peak || Spacewatch ||  || align=right | 1.2 km || 
|-id=968 bgcolor=#C2FFFF
| 573968 ||  || — || November 18, 2009 || Kitt Peak || Spacewatch || L4 || align=right | 8.0 km || 
|-id=969 bgcolor=#d6d6d6
| 573969 ||  || — || November 18, 2009 || Kitt Peak || Spacewatch ||  || align=right | 1.9 km || 
|-id=970 bgcolor=#E9E9E9
| 573970 ||  || — || November 10, 2009 || Kitt Peak || Spacewatch ||  || align=right | 1.4 km || 
|-id=971 bgcolor=#d6d6d6
| 573971 ||  || — || November 16, 2009 || Mount Lemmon || Mount Lemmon Survey ||  || align=right | 2.3 km || 
|-id=972 bgcolor=#fefefe
| 573972 ||  || — || November 16, 2009 || Kitt Peak || Spacewatch ||  || align=right data-sort-value="0.86" | 860 m || 
|-id=973 bgcolor=#E9E9E9
| 573973 ||  || — || October 12, 2009 || Mount Lemmon || Mount Lemmon Survey ||  || align=right | 1.5 km || 
|-id=974 bgcolor=#E9E9E9
| 573974 ||  || — || March 13, 2002 || Nogales || M. Schwartz ||  || align=right | 1.5 km || 
|-id=975 bgcolor=#E9E9E9
| 573975 ||  || — || November 17, 2009 || Mount Lemmon || Mount Lemmon Survey ||  || align=right | 1.1 km || 
|-id=976 bgcolor=#E9E9E9
| 573976 ||  || — || November 17, 2009 || Mount Lemmon || Mount Lemmon Survey ||  || align=right | 1.7 km || 
|-id=977 bgcolor=#E9E9E9
| 573977 ||  || — || September 19, 2009 || Mount Lemmon || Mount Lemmon Survey ||  || align=right | 1.0 km || 
|-id=978 bgcolor=#E9E9E9
| 573978 ||  || — || November 17, 2009 || Mount Lemmon || Mount Lemmon Survey ||  || align=right | 2.2 km || 
|-id=979 bgcolor=#E9E9E9
| 573979 ||  || — || November 17, 2009 || Mount Lemmon || Mount Lemmon Survey ||  || align=right | 1.4 km || 
|-id=980 bgcolor=#E9E9E9
| 573980 ||  || — || November 17, 2009 || Mount Lemmon || Mount Lemmon Survey ||  || align=right | 1.3 km || 
|-id=981 bgcolor=#E9E9E9
| 573981 ||  || — || October 30, 2009 || Mount Lemmon || Mount Lemmon Survey ||  || align=right | 1.5 km || 
|-id=982 bgcolor=#d6d6d6
| 573982 ||  || — || November 18, 2009 || Mount Lemmon || Mount Lemmon Survey ||  || align=right | 2.6 km || 
|-id=983 bgcolor=#E9E9E9
| 573983 ||  || — || November 18, 2009 || Mount Lemmon || Mount Lemmon Survey ||  || align=right | 1.9 km || 
|-id=984 bgcolor=#E9E9E9
| 573984 ||  || — || November 19, 2009 || Kitt Peak || Spacewatch ||  || align=right | 1.3 km || 
|-id=985 bgcolor=#E9E9E9
| 573985 ||  || — || April 25, 2007 || Kitt Peak || Spacewatch ||  || align=right | 1.3 km || 
|-id=986 bgcolor=#E9E9E9
| 573986 ||  || — || November 17, 2009 || Mount Lemmon || Mount Lemmon Survey ||  || align=right | 1.4 km || 
|-id=987 bgcolor=#E9E9E9
| 573987 ||  || — || April 23, 2007 || Kitt Peak || Spacewatch ||  || align=right | 2.4 km || 
|-id=988 bgcolor=#E9E9E9
| 573988 ||  || — || November 20, 2009 || Kitt Peak || Spacewatch ||  || align=right | 1.2 km || 
|-id=989 bgcolor=#fefefe
| 573989 ||  || — || November 18, 2009 || Kitt Peak || Spacewatch ||  || align=right data-sort-value="0.77" | 770 m || 
|-id=990 bgcolor=#E9E9E9
| 573990 ||  || — || November 17, 2009 || Mount Lemmon || Mount Lemmon Survey ||  || align=right | 1.7 km || 
|-id=991 bgcolor=#E9E9E9
| 573991 ||  || — || October 3, 2013 || Haleakala || Pan-STARRS ||  || align=right | 1.0 km || 
|-id=992 bgcolor=#E9E9E9
| 573992 ||  || — || October 1, 2013 || Kitt Peak || Spacewatch ||  || align=right | 1.3 km || 
|-id=993 bgcolor=#E9E9E9
| 573993 ||  || — || November 17, 2009 || Mount Lemmon || Mount Lemmon Survey ||  || align=right | 1.4 km || 
|-id=994 bgcolor=#E9E9E9
| 573994 ||  || — || November 1, 2013 || Catalina || CSS ||  || align=right | 1.7 km || 
|-id=995 bgcolor=#E9E9E9
| 573995 ||  || — || September 15, 2013 || Haleakala || Pan-STARRS ||  || align=right | 1.1 km || 
|-id=996 bgcolor=#E9E9E9
| 573996 ||  || — || November 11, 2013 || Kitt Peak || Spacewatch ||  || align=right | 1.4 km || 
|-id=997 bgcolor=#d6d6d6
| 573997 ||  || — || January 14, 2016 || Mount Lemmon || Mount Lemmon Survey ||  || align=right | 2.2 km || 
|-id=998 bgcolor=#E9E9E9
| 573998 ||  || — || November 20, 2009 || Kitt Peak || Spacewatch ||  || align=right | 1.6 km || 
|-id=999 bgcolor=#E9E9E9
| 573999 ||  || — || October 15, 2013 || Catalina || CSS ||  || align=right | 2.3 km || 
|-id=000 bgcolor=#E9E9E9
| 574000 ||  || — || November 20, 2009 || Kitt Peak || Spacewatch ||  || align=right | 1.5 km || 
|}

References

External links 
 Discovery Circumstances: Numbered Minor Planets (570001)–(575000) (IAU Minor Planet Center)

0573